

391001–391100 

|-bgcolor=#d6d6d6
| 391001 ||  || — || September 26, 2005 || Kitt Peak || Spacewatch || — || align=right | 3.0 km || 
|-id=002 bgcolor=#fefefe
| 391002 ||  || — || September 26, 2005 || Kitt Peak || Spacewatch || — || align=right data-sort-value="0.75" | 750 m || 
|-id=003 bgcolor=#fefefe
| 391003 ||  || — || September 27, 2005 || Kitt Peak || Spacewatch || — || align=right data-sort-value="0.76" | 760 m || 
|-id=004 bgcolor=#fefefe
| 391004 ||  || — || September 27, 2005 || Kitt Peak || Spacewatch || — || align=right data-sort-value="0.72" | 720 m || 
|-id=005 bgcolor=#fefefe
| 391005 ||  || — || September 23, 2005 || Catalina || CSS || — || align=right data-sort-value="0.83" | 830 m || 
|-id=006 bgcolor=#d6d6d6
| 391006 ||  || — || September 29, 2005 || Anderson Mesa || LONEOS || — || align=right | 3.4 km || 
|-id=007 bgcolor=#fefefe
| 391007 ||  || — || September 26, 2005 || Kitt Peak || Spacewatch || FLO || align=right data-sort-value="0.61" | 610 m || 
|-id=008 bgcolor=#fefefe
| 391008 ||  || — || September 29, 2005 || Kitt Peak || Spacewatch || — || align=right data-sort-value="0.64" | 640 m || 
|-id=009 bgcolor=#fefefe
| 391009 ||  || — || September 29, 2005 || Kitt Peak || Spacewatch || — || align=right data-sort-value="0.85" | 850 m || 
|-id=010 bgcolor=#fefefe
| 391010 ||  || — || September 29, 2005 || Kitt Peak || Spacewatch || ERI || align=right | 1.1 km || 
|-id=011 bgcolor=#d6d6d6
| 391011 ||  || — || September 29, 2005 || Kitt Peak || Spacewatch || — || align=right | 2.0 km || 
|-id=012 bgcolor=#d6d6d6
| 391012 ||  || — || September 29, 2005 || Kitt Peak || Spacewatch || EOS || align=right | 1.8 km || 
|-id=013 bgcolor=#fefefe
| 391013 ||  || — || September 29, 2005 || Kitt Peak || Spacewatch || V || align=right data-sort-value="0.60" | 600 m || 
|-id=014 bgcolor=#fefefe
| 391014 ||  || — || September 29, 2005 || Palomar || NEAT || V || align=right data-sort-value="0.71" | 710 m || 
|-id=015 bgcolor=#fefefe
| 391015 ||  || — || September 29, 2005 || Anderson Mesa || LONEOS || — || align=right | 1.1 km || 
|-id=016 bgcolor=#d6d6d6
| 391016 ||  || — || September 9, 2005 || Socorro || LINEAR || — || align=right | 3.7 km || 
|-id=017 bgcolor=#d6d6d6
| 391017 ||  || — || September 30, 2005 || Mount Lemmon || Mount Lemmon Survey || — || align=right | 2.6 km || 
|-id=018 bgcolor=#d6d6d6
| 391018 ||  || — || September 30, 2005 || Mount Lemmon || Mount Lemmon Survey || — || align=right | 3.6 km || 
|-id=019 bgcolor=#fefefe
| 391019 ||  || — || September 29, 2005 || Kitt Peak || Spacewatch || V || align=right data-sort-value="0.71" | 710 m || 
|-id=020 bgcolor=#fefefe
| 391020 ||  || — || September 29, 2005 || Mount Lemmon || Mount Lemmon Survey || V || align=right data-sort-value="0.68" | 680 m || 
|-id=021 bgcolor=#fefefe
| 391021 ||  || — || September 29, 2005 || Kitt Peak || Spacewatch || — || align=right data-sort-value="0.67" | 670 m || 
|-id=022 bgcolor=#d6d6d6
| 391022 ||  || — || September 30, 2005 || Mount Lemmon || Mount Lemmon Survey || — || align=right | 2.9 km || 
|-id=023 bgcolor=#d6d6d6
| 391023 ||  || — || September 22, 2005 || Palomar || NEAT || — || align=right | 3.1 km || 
|-id=024 bgcolor=#d6d6d6
| 391024 ||  || — || September 22, 2005 || Palomar || NEAT || EOS || align=right | 2.2 km || 
|-id=025 bgcolor=#d6d6d6
| 391025 ||  || — || September 25, 2005 || Kitt Peak || Spacewatch || — || align=right | 3.1 km || 
|-id=026 bgcolor=#fefefe
| 391026 ||  || — || September 30, 2005 || Anderson Mesa || LONEOS || — || align=right | 1.8 km || 
|-id=027 bgcolor=#d6d6d6
| 391027 ||  || — || September 30, 2005 || Anderson Mesa || LONEOS || — || align=right | 3.4 km || 
|-id=028 bgcolor=#d6d6d6
| 391028 ||  || — || September 29, 2005 || Anderson Mesa || LONEOS || — || align=right | 3.0 km || 
|-id=029 bgcolor=#fefefe
| 391029 ||  || — || September 25, 2005 || Kitt Peak || Spacewatch || — || align=right data-sort-value="0.68" | 680 m || 
|-id=030 bgcolor=#fefefe
| 391030 ||  || — || October 1, 2005 || Mount Lemmon || Mount Lemmon Survey || FLO || align=right data-sort-value="0.72" | 720 m || 
|-id=031 bgcolor=#fefefe
| 391031 ||  || — || October 1, 2005 || Catalina || CSS || — || align=right | 1.1 km || 
|-id=032 bgcolor=#d6d6d6
| 391032 ||  || — || October 2, 2005 || Anderson Mesa || LONEOS || EUP || align=right | 6.0 km || 
|-id=033 bgcolor=#FFC2E0
| 391033 ||  || — || October 3, 2005 || Mount Lemmon || Mount Lemmon Survey || AMOslow || align=right data-sort-value="0.54" | 540 m || 
|-id=034 bgcolor=#d6d6d6
| 391034 ||  || — || October 1, 2005 || Mount Lemmon || Mount Lemmon Survey || — || align=right | 3.1 km || 
|-id=035 bgcolor=#fefefe
| 391035 ||  || — || October 1, 2005 || Mount Lemmon || Mount Lemmon Survey || — || align=right data-sort-value="0.90" | 900 m || 
|-id=036 bgcolor=#d6d6d6
| 391036 ||  || — || October 1, 2005 || Socorro || LINEAR || — || align=right | 3.0 km || 
|-id=037 bgcolor=#fefefe
| 391037 ||  || — || October 3, 2005 || Catalina || CSS || — || align=right data-sort-value="0.86" | 860 m || 
|-id=038 bgcolor=#fefefe
| 391038 ||  || — || October 7, 2005 || Anderson Mesa || LONEOS || — || align=right data-sort-value="0.81" | 810 m || 
|-id=039 bgcolor=#d6d6d6
| 391039 ||  || — || May 10, 2003 || Kitt Peak || Spacewatch || — || align=right | 3.0 km || 
|-id=040 bgcolor=#fefefe
| 391040 ||  || — || October 3, 2005 || Kitt Peak || Spacewatch || FLO || align=right data-sort-value="0.56" | 560 m || 
|-id=041 bgcolor=#fefefe
| 391041 ||  || — || October 5, 2005 || Mount Lemmon || Mount Lemmon Survey || — || align=right data-sort-value="0.68" | 680 m || 
|-id=042 bgcolor=#d6d6d6
| 391042 ||  || — || October 8, 2005 || Moletai || Molėtai Obs. || — || align=right | 3.7 km || 
|-id=043 bgcolor=#fefefe
| 391043 ||  || — || October 7, 2005 || Kitt Peak || Spacewatch || — || align=right data-sort-value="0.82" | 820 m || 
|-id=044 bgcolor=#d6d6d6
| 391044 ||  || — || October 7, 2005 || Kitt Peak || Spacewatch || — || align=right | 2.5 km || 
|-id=045 bgcolor=#fefefe
| 391045 ||  || — || October 8, 2005 || Kitt Peak || Spacewatch || — || align=right data-sort-value="0.86" | 860 m || 
|-id=046 bgcolor=#d6d6d6
| 391046 ||  || — || September 29, 2005 || Kitt Peak || Spacewatch || TIR || align=right | 4.0 km || 
|-id=047 bgcolor=#fefefe
| 391047 ||  || — || October 8, 2005 || Kitt Peak || Spacewatch || — || align=right data-sort-value="0.86" | 860 m || 
|-id=048 bgcolor=#fefefe
| 391048 ||  || — || October 9, 2005 || Kitt Peak || Spacewatch || — || align=right data-sort-value="0.75" | 750 m || 
|-id=049 bgcolor=#d6d6d6
| 391049 ||  || — || October 9, 2005 || Kitt Peak || Spacewatch || — || align=right | 3.2 km || 
|-id=050 bgcolor=#d6d6d6
| 391050 ||  || — || October 9, 2005 || Kitt Peak || Spacewatch || — || align=right | 5.4 km || 
|-id=051 bgcolor=#fefefe
| 391051 ||  || — || October 9, 2005 || Kitt Peak || Spacewatch || — || align=right data-sort-value="0.97" | 970 m || 
|-id=052 bgcolor=#d6d6d6
| 391052 ||  || — || October 9, 2005 || Kitt Peak || Spacewatch || VER || align=right | 3.2 km || 
|-id=053 bgcolor=#fefefe
| 391053 ||  || — || September 27, 2005 || Kitt Peak || Spacewatch || — || align=right data-sort-value="0.90" | 900 m || 
|-id=054 bgcolor=#fefefe
| 391054 ||  || — || October 1, 2005 || Kitt Peak || Spacewatch || — || align=right data-sort-value="0.70" | 700 m || 
|-id=055 bgcolor=#fefefe
| 391055 ||  || — || October 1, 2005 || Kitt Peak || Spacewatch || — || align=right data-sort-value="0.81" | 810 m || 
|-id=056 bgcolor=#fefefe
| 391056 ||  || — || October 12, 2005 || Kitt Peak || Spacewatch || V || align=right data-sort-value="0.68" | 680 m || 
|-id=057 bgcolor=#fefefe
| 391057 ||  || — || October 26, 2005 || Ottmarsheim || C. Rinner || V || align=right data-sort-value="0.62" | 620 m || 
|-id=058 bgcolor=#d6d6d6
| 391058 ||  || — || October 24, 2005 || Kitt Peak || Spacewatch || TIR || align=right | 4.3 km || 
|-id=059 bgcolor=#fefefe
| 391059 ||  || — || October 24, 2005 || Kitt Peak || Spacewatch || — || align=right data-sort-value="0.82" | 820 m || 
|-id=060 bgcolor=#fefefe
| 391060 ||  || — || October 22, 2005 || Kitt Peak || Spacewatch || — || align=right data-sort-value="0.77" | 770 m || 
|-id=061 bgcolor=#fefefe
| 391061 ||  || — || October 22, 2005 || Kitt Peak || Spacewatch || V || align=right data-sort-value="0.59" | 590 m || 
|-id=062 bgcolor=#fefefe
| 391062 ||  || — || October 24, 2005 || Anderson Mesa || LONEOS || V || align=right data-sort-value="0.75" | 750 m || 
|-id=063 bgcolor=#fefefe
| 391063 ||  || — || October 25, 2005 || Kitt Peak || Spacewatch || — || align=right data-sort-value="0.98" | 980 m || 
|-id=064 bgcolor=#d6d6d6
| 391064 ||  || — || October 23, 2005 || Catalina || CSS || LIX || align=right | 5.1 km || 
|-id=065 bgcolor=#d6d6d6
| 391065 ||  || — || October 22, 2005 || Kitt Peak || Spacewatch || — || align=right | 2.9 km || 
|-id=066 bgcolor=#fefefe
| 391066 ||  || — || October 22, 2005 || Kitt Peak || Spacewatch || FLO || align=right data-sort-value="0.51" | 510 m || 
|-id=067 bgcolor=#d6d6d6
| 391067 ||  || — || October 22, 2005 || Kitt Peak || Spacewatch || — || align=right | 3.2 km || 
|-id=068 bgcolor=#fefefe
| 391068 ||  || — || October 22, 2005 || Kitt Peak || Spacewatch || V || align=right data-sort-value="0.64" | 640 m || 
|-id=069 bgcolor=#fefefe
| 391069 ||  || — || October 22, 2005 || Kitt Peak || Spacewatch || — || align=right data-sort-value="0.80" | 800 m || 
|-id=070 bgcolor=#fefefe
| 391070 ||  || — || October 22, 2005 || Kitt Peak || Spacewatch || MAS || align=right data-sort-value="0.78" | 780 m || 
|-id=071 bgcolor=#d6d6d6
| 391071 ||  || — || October 22, 2005 || Kitt Peak || Spacewatch || EUP || align=right | 5.2 km || 
|-id=072 bgcolor=#fefefe
| 391072 ||  || — || October 22, 2005 || Kitt Peak || Spacewatch || — || align=right data-sort-value="0.85" | 850 m || 
|-id=073 bgcolor=#fefefe
| 391073 ||  || — || October 23, 2005 || Catalina || CSS || — || align=right data-sort-value="0.95" | 950 m || 
|-id=074 bgcolor=#fefefe
| 391074 ||  || — || October 5, 2005 || Kitt Peak || Spacewatch || — || align=right | 1.0 km || 
|-id=075 bgcolor=#d6d6d6
| 391075 ||  || — || October 25, 2005 || Mount Lemmon || Mount Lemmon Survey || EOS || align=right | 1.8 km || 
|-id=076 bgcolor=#d6d6d6
| 391076 ||  || — || October 25, 2005 || Mount Lemmon || Mount Lemmon Survey || VER || align=right | 2.6 km || 
|-id=077 bgcolor=#fefefe
| 391077 ||  || — || October 26, 2005 || Anderson Mesa || LONEOS || ERI || align=right | 1.7 km || 
|-id=078 bgcolor=#fefefe
| 391078 ||  || — || October 22, 2005 || Kitt Peak || Spacewatch || — || align=right data-sort-value="0.90" | 900 m || 
|-id=079 bgcolor=#fefefe
| 391079 ||  || — || October 24, 2005 || Kitt Peak || Spacewatch || — || align=right data-sort-value="0.85" | 850 m || 
|-id=080 bgcolor=#fefefe
| 391080 ||  || — || October 27, 2005 || Mount Lemmon || Mount Lemmon Survey || — || align=right data-sort-value="0.83" | 830 m || 
|-id=081 bgcolor=#d6d6d6
| 391081 ||  || — || October 1, 2005 || Mount Lemmon || Mount Lemmon Survey || — || align=right | 2.5 km || 
|-id=082 bgcolor=#d6d6d6
| 391082 ||  || — || October 22, 2005 || Palomar || NEAT || — || align=right | 4.5 km || 
|-id=083 bgcolor=#fefefe
| 391083 ||  || — || October 25, 2005 || Kitt Peak || Spacewatch || V || align=right data-sort-value="0.68" | 680 m || 
|-id=084 bgcolor=#d6d6d6
| 391084 ||  || — || October 25, 2005 || Kitt Peak || Spacewatch || — || align=right | 2.9 km || 
|-id=085 bgcolor=#fefefe
| 391085 ||  || — || October 25, 2005 || Kitt Peak || Spacewatch || — || align=right data-sort-value="0.79" | 790 m || 
|-id=086 bgcolor=#fefefe
| 391086 ||  || — || October 25, 2005 || Kitt Peak || Spacewatch || V || align=right data-sort-value="0.67" | 670 m || 
|-id=087 bgcolor=#d6d6d6
| 391087 ||  || — || October 27, 2005 || Kitt Peak || Spacewatch || — || align=right | 2.1 km || 
|-id=088 bgcolor=#fefefe
| 391088 ||  || — || October 5, 2005 || Kitt Peak || Spacewatch || — || align=right data-sort-value="0.82" | 820 m || 
|-id=089 bgcolor=#d6d6d6
| 391089 ||  || — || October 24, 2005 || Kitt Peak || Spacewatch || EOS || align=right | 2.5 km || 
|-id=090 bgcolor=#d6d6d6
| 391090 ||  || — || October 26, 2005 || Kitt Peak || Spacewatch || — || align=right | 4.6 km || 
|-id=091 bgcolor=#d6d6d6
| 391091 ||  || — || October 28, 2005 || Mount Lemmon || Mount Lemmon Survey || HYG || align=right | 3.2 km || 
|-id=092 bgcolor=#d6d6d6
| 391092 ||  || — || October 29, 2005 || Mount Lemmon || Mount Lemmon Survey || — || align=right | 2.6 km || 
|-id=093 bgcolor=#d6d6d6
| 391093 ||  || — || October 29, 2005 || Kitt Peak || Spacewatch || — || align=right | 3.2 km || 
|-id=094 bgcolor=#fefefe
| 391094 ||  || — || October 29, 2005 || Kitt Peak || Spacewatch || V || align=right data-sort-value="0.68" | 680 m || 
|-id=095 bgcolor=#fefefe
| 391095 ||  || — || October 29, 2005 || Mount Lemmon || Mount Lemmon Survey || NYS || align=right data-sort-value="0.60" | 600 m || 
|-id=096 bgcolor=#d6d6d6
| 391096 ||  || — || October 7, 2005 || Kitt Peak || Spacewatch || — || align=right | 2.6 km || 
|-id=097 bgcolor=#d6d6d6
| 391097 ||  || — || October 27, 2005 || Kitt Peak || Spacewatch || — || align=right | 3.7 km || 
|-id=098 bgcolor=#fefefe
| 391098 ||  || — || October 22, 2005 || Kitt Peak || Spacewatch || — || align=right data-sort-value="0.91" | 910 m || 
|-id=099 bgcolor=#fefefe
| 391099 ||  || — || October 28, 2005 || Mount Lemmon || Mount Lemmon Survey || — || align=right | 1.0 km || 
|-id=100 bgcolor=#fefefe
| 391100 ||  || — || October 28, 2005 || Socorro || LINEAR || — || align=right | 2.2 km || 
|}

391101–391200 

|-bgcolor=#d6d6d6
| 391101 ||  || — || October 30, 2005 || Kitt Peak || Spacewatch || — || align=right | 3.0 km || 
|-id=102 bgcolor=#d6d6d6
| 391102 ||  || — || October 30, 2005 || Mount Lemmon || Mount Lemmon Survey || EOS || align=right | 4.5 km || 
|-id=103 bgcolor=#d6d6d6
| 391103 ||  || — || October 30, 2005 || Kitt Peak || Spacewatch || — || align=right | 5.3 km || 
|-id=104 bgcolor=#fefefe
| 391104 ||  || — || August 30, 2005 || Kitt Peak || Spacewatch || ERI || align=right | 1.6 km || 
|-id=105 bgcolor=#d6d6d6
| 391105 ||  || — || October 27, 2005 || Mount Lemmon || Mount Lemmon Survey || TIR || align=right | 3.6 km || 
|-id=106 bgcolor=#d6d6d6
| 391106 ||  || — || October 22, 2005 || Kitt Peak || Spacewatch || URS || align=right | 3.2 km || 
|-id=107 bgcolor=#d6d6d6
| 391107 ||  || — || October 27, 2005 || Mount Lemmon || Mount Lemmon Survey || — || align=right | 3.9 km || 
|-id=108 bgcolor=#d6d6d6
| 391108 ||  || — || October 20, 2005 || Apache Point || A. C. Becker || — || align=right | 3.9 km || 
|-id=109 bgcolor=#fefefe
| 391109 ||  || — || October 25, 2005 || Apache Point || A. C. Becker || V || align=right data-sort-value="0.56" | 560 m || 
|-id=110 bgcolor=#d6d6d6
| 391110 ||  || — || November 1, 2005 || Kitt Peak || Spacewatch || — || align=right | 5.1 km || 
|-id=111 bgcolor=#fefefe
| 391111 ||  || — || November 4, 2005 || Kitt Peak || Spacewatch || V || align=right data-sort-value="0.85" | 850 m || 
|-id=112 bgcolor=#fefefe
| 391112 ||  || — || October 25, 2005 || Mount Lemmon || Mount Lemmon Survey || V || align=right data-sort-value="0.64" | 640 m || 
|-id=113 bgcolor=#fefefe
| 391113 ||  || — || November 3, 2005 || Mount Lemmon || Mount Lemmon Survey || — || align=right data-sort-value="0.80" | 800 m || 
|-id=114 bgcolor=#fefefe
| 391114 ||  || — || November 1, 2005 || Mount Lemmon || Mount Lemmon Survey || NYS || align=right data-sort-value="0.60" | 600 m || 
|-id=115 bgcolor=#d6d6d6
| 391115 ||  || — || November 2, 2005 || Kitt Peak || Spacewatch || — || align=right | 4.6 km || 
|-id=116 bgcolor=#fefefe
| 391116 ||  || — || November 4, 2005 || Kitt Peak || Spacewatch || — || align=right | 1.0 km || 
|-id=117 bgcolor=#fefefe
| 391117 ||  || — || November 1, 2005 || Mount Lemmon || Mount Lemmon Survey || V || align=right data-sort-value="0.70" | 700 m || 
|-id=118 bgcolor=#d6d6d6
| 391118 ||  || — || November 1, 2005 || Kitt Peak || Spacewatch || — || align=right | 3.6 km || 
|-id=119 bgcolor=#fefefe
| 391119 ||  || — || November 1, 2005 || Apache Point || A. C. Becker || — || align=right data-sort-value="0.73" | 730 m || 
|-id=120 bgcolor=#fefefe
| 391120 ||  || — || November 22, 2005 || Kitt Peak || Spacewatch || — || align=right data-sort-value="0.61" | 610 m || 
|-id=121 bgcolor=#d6d6d6
| 391121 ||  || — || November 22, 2005 || Kitt Peak || Spacewatch || — || align=right | 3.7 km || 
|-id=122 bgcolor=#fefefe
| 391122 ||  || — || November 22, 2005 || Kitt Peak || Spacewatch || — || align=right data-sort-value="0.74" | 740 m || 
|-id=123 bgcolor=#E9E9E9
| 391123 ||  || — || November 21, 2005 || Kitt Peak || Spacewatch || — || align=right | 2.4 km || 
|-id=124 bgcolor=#fefefe
| 391124 ||  || — || November 21, 2005 || Kitt Peak || Spacewatch || FLO || align=right data-sort-value="0.62" | 620 m || 
|-id=125 bgcolor=#fefefe
| 391125 ||  || — || November 21, 2005 || Kitt Peak || Spacewatch || V || align=right data-sort-value="0.77" | 770 m || 
|-id=126 bgcolor=#d6d6d6
| 391126 ||  || — || November 25, 2005 || Kitt Peak || Spacewatch || — || align=right | 3.5 km || 
|-id=127 bgcolor=#fefefe
| 391127 ||  || — || November 25, 2005 || Kitt Peak || Spacewatch || — || align=right data-sort-value="0.81" | 810 m || 
|-id=128 bgcolor=#fefefe
| 391128 ||  || — || October 13, 2005 || Kitt Peak || Spacewatch || V || align=right data-sort-value="0.72" | 720 m || 
|-id=129 bgcolor=#fefefe
| 391129 ||  || — || November 25, 2005 || Kitt Peak || Spacewatch || MAS || align=right data-sort-value="0.71" | 710 m || 
|-id=130 bgcolor=#fefefe
| 391130 ||  || — || November 26, 2005 || Mount Lemmon || Mount Lemmon Survey || NYS || align=right data-sort-value="0.77" | 770 m || 
|-id=131 bgcolor=#E9E9E9
| 391131 ||  || — || November 29, 2005 || Catalina || CSS || — || align=right | 1.6 km || 
|-id=132 bgcolor=#fefefe
| 391132 ||  || — || December 1, 2005 || Mount Lemmon || Mount Lemmon Survey || MAS || align=right data-sort-value="0.81" | 810 m || 
|-id=133 bgcolor=#fefefe
| 391133 ||  || — || December 1, 2005 || Socorro || LINEAR || V || align=right data-sort-value="0.70" | 700 m || 
|-id=134 bgcolor=#fefefe
| 391134 ||  || — || December 5, 2005 || Kitt Peak || Spacewatch || — || align=right | 1.1 km || 
|-id=135 bgcolor=#fefefe
| 391135 ||  || — || December 2, 2005 || Kitt Peak || Spacewatch || NYS || align=right | 1.8 km || 
|-id=136 bgcolor=#fefefe
| 391136 ||  || — || December 6, 2005 || Kitt Peak || Spacewatch || — || align=right | 1.0 km || 
|-id=137 bgcolor=#fefefe
| 391137 ||  || — || December 4, 2005 || Mount Lemmon || Mount Lemmon Survey || FLO || align=right data-sort-value="0.84" | 840 m || 
|-id=138 bgcolor=#fefefe
| 391138 ||  || — || November 10, 2005 || Mount Lemmon || Mount Lemmon Survey || H || align=right data-sort-value="0.78" | 780 m || 
|-id=139 bgcolor=#fefefe
| 391139 ||  || — || December 7, 2005 || Kitt Peak || Spacewatch || ERI || align=right | 1.8 km || 
|-id=140 bgcolor=#fefefe
| 391140 ||  || — || December 21, 2005 || Kitt Peak || Spacewatch || MAS || align=right data-sort-value="0.65" | 650 m || 
|-id=141 bgcolor=#fefefe
| 391141 ||  || — || December 22, 2005 || Kitt Peak || Spacewatch || NYS || align=right data-sort-value="0.89" | 890 m || 
|-id=142 bgcolor=#fefefe
| 391142 ||  || — || December 25, 2005 || Kitt Peak || Spacewatch || V || align=right data-sort-value="0.68" | 680 m || 
|-id=143 bgcolor=#fefefe
| 391143 ||  || — || December 24, 2005 || Kitt Peak || Spacewatch || — || align=right data-sort-value="0.69" | 690 m || 
|-id=144 bgcolor=#fefefe
| 391144 ||  || — || December 24, 2005 || Kitt Peak || Spacewatch || MAS || align=right data-sort-value="0.87" | 870 m || 
|-id=145 bgcolor=#fefefe
| 391145 ||  || — || December 24, 2005 || Kitt Peak || Spacewatch || — || align=right data-sort-value="0.72" | 720 m || 
|-id=146 bgcolor=#fefefe
| 391146 ||  || — || December 5, 2005 || Mount Lemmon || Mount Lemmon Survey || — || align=right data-sort-value="0.86" | 860 m || 
|-id=147 bgcolor=#fefefe
| 391147 ||  || — || December 24, 2005 || Kitt Peak || Spacewatch || — || align=right data-sort-value="0.86" | 860 m || 
|-id=148 bgcolor=#fefefe
| 391148 ||  || — || December 24, 2005 || Kitt Peak || Spacewatch || — || align=right data-sort-value="0.74" | 740 m || 
|-id=149 bgcolor=#fefefe
| 391149 ||  || — || December 25, 2005 || Mount Lemmon || Mount Lemmon Survey || NYS || align=right data-sort-value="0.73" | 730 m || 
|-id=150 bgcolor=#fefefe
| 391150 ||  || — || December 25, 2005 || Mount Lemmon || Mount Lemmon Survey || — || align=right data-sort-value="0.72" | 720 m || 
|-id=151 bgcolor=#FFC2E0
| 391151 ||  || — || December 29, 2005 || Socorro || LINEAR || APO +1kmcritical || align=right | 1.7 km || 
|-id=152 bgcolor=#FA8072
| 391152 ||  || — || December 24, 2005 || Socorro || LINEAR || H || align=right data-sort-value="0.94" | 940 m || 
|-id=153 bgcolor=#d6d6d6
| 391153 ||  || — || December 25, 2005 || Kitt Peak || Spacewatch || 7:4 || align=right | 4.8 km || 
|-id=154 bgcolor=#fefefe
| 391154 ||  || — || December 25, 2005 || Kitt Peak || Spacewatch || — || align=right data-sort-value="0.71" | 710 m || 
|-id=155 bgcolor=#fefefe
| 391155 ||  || — || December 25, 2005 || Kitt Peak || Spacewatch || NYS || align=right data-sort-value="0.54" | 540 m || 
|-id=156 bgcolor=#fefefe
| 391156 ||  || — || December 25, 2005 || Mount Lemmon || Mount Lemmon Survey || MAS || align=right data-sort-value="0.73" | 730 m || 
|-id=157 bgcolor=#fefefe
| 391157 ||  || — || December 26, 2005 || Kitt Peak || Spacewatch || V || align=right data-sort-value="0.80" | 800 m || 
|-id=158 bgcolor=#fefefe
| 391158 ||  || — || December 28, 2005 || Mount Lemmon || Mount Lemmon Survey || MAS || align=right data-sort-value="0.78" | 780 m || 
|-id=159 bgcolor=#fefefe
| 391159 ||  || — || December 30, 2005 || Socorro || LINEAR || PHO || align=right | 1.3 km || 
|-id=160 bgcolor=#fefefe
| 391160 ||  || — || December 30, 2005 || Kitt Peak || Spacewatch || — || align=right data-sort-value="0.75" | 750 m || 
|-id=161 bgcolor=#fefefe
| 391161 ||  || — || December 25, 2005 || Kitt Peak || Spacewatch || V || align=right data-sort-value="0.77" | 770 m || 
|-id=162 bgcolor=#fefefe
| 391162 ||  || — || October 29, 2005 || Mount Lemmon || Mount Lemmon Survey || NYS || align=right data-sort-value="0.76" | 760 m || 
|-id=163 bgcolor=#d6d6d6
| 391163 ||  || — || December 25, 2005 || Kitt Peak || Spacewatch || 7:4 || align=right | 3.9 km || 
|-id=164 bgcolor=#fefefe
| 391164 ||  || — || December 29, 2005 || Mount Lemmon || Mount Lemmon Survey || — || align=right | 2.0 km || 
|-id=165 bgcolor=#fefefe
| 391165 ||  || — || January 5, 2006 || Kitt Peak || Spacewatch || — || align=right data-sort-value="0.83" | 830 m || 
|-id=166 bgcolor=#fefefe
| 391166 ||  || — || January 5, 2006 || Kitt Peak || Spacewatch || — || align=right data-sort-value="0.91" | 910 m || 
|-id=167 bgcolor=#fefefe
| 391167 ||  || — || January 5, 2006 || Kitt Peak || Spacewatch || MAS || align=right data-sort-value="0.75" | 750 m || 
|-id=168 bgcolor=#fefefe
| 391168 ||  || — || January 7, 2006 || Mount Lemmon || Mount Lemmon Survey || — || align=right data-sort-value="0.84" | 840 m || 
|-id=169 bgcolor=#fefefe
| 391169 ||  || — || January 7, 2006 || Kitt Peak || Spacewatch || NYS || align=right data-sort-value="0.59" | 590 m || 
|-id=170 bgcolor=#fefefe
| 391170 ||  || — || January 7, 2006 || Kitt Peak || Spacewatch || NYS || align=right data-sort-value="0.79" | 790 m || 
|-id=171 bgcolor=#fefefe
| 391171 ||  || — || December 28, 2005 || Kitt Peak || Spacewatch || MAS || align=right data-sort-value="0.61" | 610 m || 
|-id=172 bgcolor=#fefefe
| 391172 ||  || — || January 5, 2006 || Kitt Peak || Spacewatch || V || align=right data-sort-value="0.65" | 650 m || 
|-id=173 bgcolor=#fefefe
| 391173 ||  || — || January 6, 2006 || Mount Lemmon || Mount Lemmon Survey || — || align=right | 1.0 km || 
|-id=174 bgcolor=#fefefe
| 391174 ||  || — || February 5, 1995 || Kitt Peak || Spacewatch || NYS || align=right data-sort-value="0.70" | 700 m || 
|-id=175 bgcolor=#fefefe
| 391175 ||  || — || December 27, 2005 || Kitt Peak || Spacewatch || NYS || align=right data-sort-value="0.76" | 760 m || 
|-id=176 bgcolor=#fefefe
| 391176 ||  || — || January 21, 2006 || Anderson Mesa || LONEOS || H || align=right data-sort-value="0.85" | 850 m || 
|-id=177 bgcolor=#fefefe
| 391177 ||  || — || January 26, 2006 || Kitt Peak || Spacewatch || V || align=right data-sort-value="0.67" | 670 m || 
|-id=178 bgcolor=#fefefe
| 391178 ||  || — || January 28, 2006 || Mount Lemmon || Mount Lemmon Survey || — || align=right data-sort-value="0.80" | 800 m || 
|-id=179 bgcolor=#fefefe
| 391179 ||  || — || January 8, 1998 || Kitt Peak || Spacewatch || H || align=right data-sort-value="0.59" | 590 m || 
|-id=180 bgcolor=#E9E9E9
| 391180 ||  || — || January 26, 2006 || Mount Lemmon || Mount Lemmon Survey || — || align=right data-sort-value="0.91" | 910 m || 
|-id=181 bgcolor=#fefefe
| 391181 ||  || — || January 27, 2006 || Mount Lemmon || Mount Lemmon Survey || — || align=right data-sort-value="0.84" | 840 m || 
|-id=182 bgcolor=#fefefe
| 391182 ||  || — || January 30, 2006 || Kitt Peak || Spacewatch || — || align=right data-sort-value="0.73" | 730 m || 
|-id=183 bgcolor=#fefefe
| 391183 ||  || — || January 30, 2006 || Kitt Peak || Spacewatch || — || align=right data-sort-value="0.78" | 780 m || 
|-id=184 bgcolor=#fefefe
| 391184 ||  || — || January 31, 2006 || Kitt Peak || Spacewatch || MAS || align=right data-sort-value="0.81" | 810 m || 
|-id=185 bgcolor=#fefefe
| 391185 ||  || — || January 26, 2006 || Anderson Mesa || LONEOS || H || align=right data-sort-value="0.68" | 680 m || 
|-id=186 bgcolor=#fefefe
| 391186 ||  || — || January 30, 2006 || Kitt Peak || Spacewatch || NYS || align=right data-sort-value="0.66" | 660 m || 
|-id=187 bgcolor=#fefefe
| 391187 ||  || — || January 31, 2006 || Kitt Peak || Spacewatch || NYS || align=right data-sort-value="0.79" | 790 m || 
|-id=188 bgcolor=#E9E9E9
| 391188 ||  || — || January 21, 2006 || Kitt Peak || Spacewatch || JUL || align=right | 1.4 km || 
|-id=189 bgcolor=#E9E9E9
| 391189 ||  || — || January 9, 2006 || Kitt Peak || Spacewatch || — || align=right | 2.2 km || 
|-id=190 bgcolor=#E9E9E9
| 391190 ||  || — || February 21, 2006 || Catalina || CSS || — || align=right | 1.2 km || 
|-id=191 bgcolor=#E9E9E9
| 391191 ||  || — || February 22, 2006 || Catalina || CSS || — || align=right | 1.9 km || 
|-id=192 bgcolor=#fefefe
| 391192 ||  || — || February 22, 2006 || Kitt Peak || Spacewatch || MAS || align=right data-sort-value="0.80" | 800 m || 
|-id=193 bgcolor=#E9E9E9
| 391193 ||  || — || February 24, 2006 || Kitt Peak || Spacewatch || — || align=right | 1.5 km || 
|-id=194 bgcolor=#fefefe
| 391194 ||  || — || February 2, 2006 || Kitt Peak || Spacewatch || V || align=right data-sort-value="0.67" | 670 m || 
|-id=195 bgcolor=#E9E9E9
| 391195 ||  || — || March 2, 2006 || Kitt Peak || Spacewatch || — || align=right | 1.7 km || 
|-id=196 bgcolor=#E9E9E9
| 391196 ||  || — || March 5, 2006 || Kitt Peak || Spacewatch || — || align=right | 1.2 km || 
|-id=197 bgcolor=#E9E9E9
| 391197 ||  || — || March 23, 2006 || Kitt Peak || Spacewatch || — || align=right data-sort-value="0.98" | 980 m || 
|-id=198 bgcolor=#E9E9E9
| 391198 ||  || — || March 24, 2006 || Kitt Peak || Spacewatch || — || align=right | 1.1 km || 
|-id=199 bgcolor=#fefefe
| 391199 ||  || — || March 23, 2006 || Catalina || CSS || H || align=right data-sort-value="0.75" | 750 m || 
|-id=200 bgcolor=#E9E9E9
| 391200 ||  || — || April 2, 2006 || Kitt Peak || Spacewatch || — || align=right | 1.1 km || 
|}

391201–391300 

|-bgcolor=#E9E9E9
| 391201 ||  || — || April 2, 2006 || Kitt Peak || Spacewatch || — || align=right | 1.0 km || 
|-id=202 bgcolor=#E9E9E9
| 391202 ||  || — || April 2, 2006 || Kitt Peak || Spacewatch || KON || align=right | 1.7 km || 
|-id=203 bgcolor=#E9E9E9
| 391203 ||  || — || April 8, 2006 || Kitt Peak || Spacewatch || — || align=right data-sort-value="0.94" | 940 m || 
|-id=204 bgcolor=#fefefe
| 391204 ||  || — || April 20, 2006 || Kitt Peak || Spacewatch || H || align=right data-sort-value="0.60" | 600 m || 
|-id=205 bgcolor=#E9E9E9
| 391205 ||  || — || April 21, 2006 || Kitt Peak || Spacewatch || — || align=right | 1.3 km || 
|-id=206 bgcolor=#E9E9E9
| 391206 ||  || — || April 21, 2006 || Kitt Peak || Spacewatch || — || align=right | 1.9 km || 
|-id=207 bgcolor=#E9E9E9
| 391207 ||  || — || April 24, 2006 || Mount Lemmon || Mount Lemmon Survey || — || align=right data-sort-value="0.83" | 830 m || 
|-id=208 bgcolor=#E9E9E9
| 391208 ||  || — || April 24, 2006 || Kitt Peak || Spacewatch || — || align=right | 1.00 km || 
|-id=209 bgcolor=#E9E9E9
| 391209 ||  || — || April 24, 2006 || Kitt Peak || Spacewatch || — || align=right data-sort-value="0.90" | 900 m || 
|-id=210 bgcolor=#d6d6d6
| 391210 ||  || — || April 26, 2006 || Saint-Sulpice || B. Christophe || 3:2 || align=right | 6.0 km || 
|-id=211 bgcolor=#FFC2E0
| 391211 ||  || — || April 27, 2006 || Catalina || CSS || AMOPHA || align=right data-sort-value="0.41" | 410 m || 
|-id=212 bgcolor=#E9E9E9
| 391212 ||  || — || April 24, 2006 || Mount Lemmon || Mount Lemmon Survey || — || align=right | 1.1 km || 
|-id=213 bgcolor=#E9E9E9
| 391213 ||  || — || April 25, 2006 || Kitt Peak || Spacewatch || — || align=right | 1.1 km || 
|-id=214 bgcolor=#E9E9E9
| 391214 ||  || — || April 25, 2006 || Kitt Peak || Spacewatch || KON || align=right | 2.3 km || 
|-id=215 bgcolor=#E9E9E9
| 391215 ||  || — || April 20, 2006 || Siding Spring || SSS || — || align=right | 3.1 km || 
|-id=216 bgcolor=#E9E9E9
| 391216 ||  || — || April 21, 2006 || Kitt Peak || Spacewatch || MAR || align=right | 1.4 km || 
|-id=217 bgcolor=#E9E9E9
| 391217 ||  || — || April 29, 2006 || Kitt Peak || Spacewatch || — || align=right data-sort-value="0.92" | 920 m || 
|-id=218 bgcolor=#d6d6d6
| 391218 ||  || — || April 30, 2006 || Kitt Peak || Spacewatch || — || align=right | 4.2 km || 
|-id=219 bgcolor=#E9E9E9
| 391219 ||  || — || April 29, 2006 || Kitt Peak || Spacewatch || GER || align=right | 1.3 km || 
|-id=220 bgcolor=#E9E9E9
| 391220 ||  || — || April 30, 2006 || Kitt Peak || Spacewatch || EUN || align=right | 1.3 km || 
|-id=221 bgcolor=#E9E9E9
| 391221 ||  || — || April 27, 2006 || Cerro Tololo || M. W. Buie || — || align=right | 1.5 km || 
|-id=222 bgcolor=#E9E9E9
| 391222 ||  || — || April 24, 2006 || Kitt Peak || Spacewatch || — || align=right | 1.1 km || 
|-id=223 bgcolor=#E9E9E9
| 391223 ||  || — || May 1, 2006 || Kitt Peak || Spacewatch || — || align=right | 1.0 km || 
|-id=224 bgcolor=#E9E9E9
| 391224 ||  || — || January 16, 2005 || Kitt Peak || Spacewatch || — || align=right | 1.1 km || 
|-id=225 bgcolor=#E9E9E9
| 391225 ||  || — || April 24, 2006 || Kitt Peak || Spacewatch || RAF || align=right data-sort-value="0.92" | 920 m || 
|-id=226 bgcolor=#E9E9E9
| 391226 ||  || — || May 3, 2006 || Kitt Peak || Spacewatch || — || align=right | 1.9 km || 
|-id=227 bgcolor=#fefefe
| 391227 ||  || — || May 4, 2006 || Kitt Peak || Spacewatch || H || align=right data-sort-value="0.64" | 640 m || 
|-id=228 bgcolor=#E9E9E9
| 391228 ||  || — || May 10, 2006 || Palomar || NEAT || — || align=right | 1.6 km || 
|-id=229 bgcolor=#E9E9E9
| 391229 ||  || — || May 9, 2006 || Mount Lemmon || Mount Lemmon Survey || — || align=right | 2.5 km || 
|-id=230 bgcolor=#E9E9E9
| 391230 ||  || — || May 18, 2006 || Palomar || NEAT || ADE || align=right | 2.7 km || 
|-id=231 bgcolor=#E9E9E9
| 391231 ||  || — || May 19, 2006 || Mount Lemmon || Mount Lemmon Survey || — || align=right | 1.4 km || 
|-id=232 bgcolor=#E9E9E9
| 391232 ||  || — || May 20, 2006 || Kitt Peak || Spacewatch || — || align=right data-sort-value="0.94" | 940 m || 
|-id=233 bgcolor=#E9E9E9
| 391233 ||  || — || May 21, 2006 || Kitt Peak || Spacewatch || MAR || align=right | 1.3 km || 
|-id=234 bgcolor=#E9E9E9
| 391234 ||  || — || May 22, 2006 || Kitt Peak || Spacewatch || — || align=right | 1.0 km || 
|-id=235 bgcolor=#E9E9E9
| 391235 ||  || — || May 24, 2006 || Kitt Peak || Spacewatch || — || align=right | 1.5 km || 
|-id=236 bgcolor=#E9E9E9
| 391236 ||  || — || May 25, 2006 || Mount Lemmon || Mount Lemmon Survey || ADE || align=right | 2.1 km || 
|-id=237 bgcolor=#E9E9E9
| 391237 ||  || — || May 26, 2006 || Kitt Peak || Spacewatch || RAF || align=right | 1.8 km || 
|-id=238 bgcolor=#E9E9E9
| 391238 ||  || — || May 31, 2006 || Mount Lemmon || Mount Lemmon Survey || — || align=right | 2.6 km || 
|-id=239 bgcolor=#E9E9E9
| 391239 ||  || — || May 23, 2006 || Catalina || CSS || — || align=right | 2.5 km || 
|-id=240 bgcolor=#E9E9E9
| 391240 ||  || — || May 25, 2006 || Mauna Kea || P. A. Wiegert || — || align=right | 1.2 km || 
|-id=241 bgcolor=#E9E9E9
| 391241 ||  || — || June 22, 2006 || Kitt Peak || Spacewatch || HOF || align=right | 2.8 km || 
|-id=242 bgcolor=#E9E9E9
| 391242 ||  || — || August 12, 2006 || Palomar || NEAT || — || align=right | 1.5 km || 
|-id=243 bgcolor=#E9E9E9
| 391243 ||  || — || August 14, 2006 || Siding Spring || SSS || BAR || align=right | 1.4 km || 
|-id=244 bgcolor=#E9E9E9
| 391244 ||  || — || August 17, 2006 || Palomar || NEAT || — || align=right | 2.9 km || 
|-id=245 bgcolor=#E9E9E9
| 391245 ||  || — || August 19, 2006 || Kitt Peak || Spacewatch || AGN || align=right | 1.2 km || 
|-id=246 bgcolor=#d6d6d6
| 391246 ||  || — || August 19, 2006 || Kitt Peak || Spacewatch || — || align=right | 3.7 km || 
|-id=247 bgcolor=#E9E9E9
| 391247 ||  || — || August 21, 2006 || Kitt Peak || Spacewatch || MRX || align=right | 1.0 km || 
|-id=248 bgcolor=#E9E9E9
| 391248 ||  || — || August 21, 2006 || Kitt Peak || Spacewatch || — || align=right | 2.0 km || 
|-id=249 bgcolor=#d6d6d6
| 391249 ||  || — || August 19, 2006 || Kitt Peak || Spacewatch || EMA || align=right | 3.0 km || 
|-id=250 bgcolor=#E9E9E9
| 391250 ||  || — || August 16, 2006 || Palomar || NEAT || INO || align=right | 1.3 km || 
|-id=251 bgcolor=#E9E9E9
| 391251 ||  || — || August 27, 2006 || Anderson Mesa || LONEOS || — || align=right | 2.1 km || 
|-id=252 bgcolor=#E9E9E9
| 391252 ||  || — || August 28, 2006 || Socorro || LINEAR || IAN || align=right data-sort-value="0.97" | 970 m || 
|-id=253 bgcolor=#E9E9E9
| 391253 ||  || — || March 8, 2005 || Mount Lemmon || Mount Lemmon Survey || — || align=right | 1.7 km || 
|-id=254 bgcolor=#d6d6d6
| 391254 ||  || — || August 19, 2006 || Kitt Peak || Spacewatch || KOR || align=right | 1.4 km || 
|-id=255 bgcolor=#E9E9E9
| 391255 ||  || — || August 29, 2006 || Catalina || CSS || — || align=right | 2.1 km || 
|-id=256 bgcolor=#E9E9E9
| 391256 ||  || — || August 29, 2006 || Anderson Mesa || LONEOS || — || align=right | 1.6 km || 
|-id=257 bgcolor=#E9E9E9
| 391257 Wilwheaton ||  ||  || September 12, 2006 || Uccle || T. Pauwels || IAN || align=right data-sort-value="0.99" | 990 m || 
|-id=258 bgcolor=#E9E9E9
| 391258 ||  || — || September 12, 2006 || Socorro || LINEAR || — || align=right | 3.3 km || 
|-id=259 bgcolor=#d6d6d6
| 391259 ||  || — || September 14, 2006 || Catalina || CSS || — || align=right | 3.4 km || 
|-id=260 bgcolor=#d6d6d6
| 391260 ||  || — || September 14, 2006 || Kitt Peak || Spacewatch || — || align=right | 2.1 km || 
|-id=261 bgcolor=#d6d6d6
| 391261 ||  || — || September 14, 2006 || Catalina || CSS || — || align=right | 3.2 km || 
|-id=262 bgcolor=#d6d6d6
| 391262 ||  || — || September 15, 2006 || Kitt Peak || Spacewatch || KOR || align=right | 1.3 km || 
|-id=263 bgcolor=#d6d6d6
| 391263 ||  || — || September 15, 2006 || Kitt Peak || Spacewatch || — || align=right | 3.3 km || 
|-id=264 bgcolor=#E9E9E9
| 391264 ||  || — || September 15, 2006 || Kitt Peak || Spacewatch || — || align=right | 2.5 km || 
|-id=265 bgcolor=#E9E9E9
| 391265 ||  || — || September 17, 2006 || Kitt Peak || Spacewatch || — || align=right | 1.3 km || 
|-id=266 bgcolor=#E9E9E9
| 391266 ||  || — || September 17, 2006 || Anderson Mesa || LONEOS || — || align=right | 3.1 km || 
|-id=267 bgcolor=#d6d6d6
| 391267 ||  || — || September 18, 2006 || Kitt Peak || Spacewatch || — || align=right | 2.1 km || 
|-id=268 bgcolor=#d6d6d6
| 391268 ||  || — || September 18, 2006 || Catalina || CSS || — || align=right | 4.0 km || 
|-id=269 bgcolor=#d6d6d6
| 391269 ||  || — || September 18, 2006 || Anderson Mesa || LONEOS || — || align=right | 3.6 km || 
|-id=270 bgcolor=#d6d6d6
| 391270 ||  || — || September 18, 2006 || Kitt Peak || Spacewatch || — || align=right | 4.7 km || 
|-id=271 bgcolor=#d6d6d6
| 391271 ||  || — || September 18, 2006 || Kitt Peak || Spacewatch || BRA || align=right | 2.5 km || 
|-id=272 bgcolor=#d6d6d6
| 391272 ||  || — || August 18, 2006 || Kitt Peak || Spacewatch || EOS || align=right | 1.6 km || 
|-id=273 bgcolor=#d6d6d6
| 391273 ||  || — || September 24, 2006 || Kitt Peak || Spacewatch || EOS || align=right | 2.0 km || 
|-id=274 bgcolor=#d6d6d6
| 391274 ||  || — || September 15, 2006 || Kitt Peak || Spacewatch || EOS || align=right | 1.7 km || 
|-id=275 bgcolor=#FFC2E0
| 391275 ||  || — || September 26, 2006 || Siding Spring || SSS || AMO +1km || align=right data-sort-value="0.93" | 930 m || 
|-id=276 bgcolor=#d6d6d6
| 391276 ||  || — || September 19, 2006 || Kitt Peak || Spacewatch || HYG || align=right | 2.2 km || 
|-id=277 bgcolor=#d6d6d6
| 391277 ||  || — || September 19, 2006 || Kitt Peak || Spacewatch || — || align=right | 2.4 km || 
|-id=278 bgcolor=#E9E9E9
| 391278 ||  || — || September 19, 2006 || Kitt Peak || Spacewatch || DOR || align=right | 2.2 km || 
|-id=279 bgcolor=#d6d6d6
| 391279 ||  || — || September 17, 2006 || Catalina || CSS || — || align=right | 2.9 km || 
|-id=280 bgcolor=#d6d6d6
| 391280 ||  || — || September 25, 2006 || Kitt Peak || Spacewatch || — || align=right | 2.4 km || 
|-id=281 bgcolor=#E9E9E9
| 391281 ||  || — || September 17, 2006 || Kitt Peak || Spacewatch || — || align=right | 1.9 km || 
|-id=282 bgcolor=#E9E9E9
| 391282 ||  || — || September 25, 2006 || Kitt Peak || Spacewatch || INO || align=right | 1.4 km || 
|-id=283 bgcolor=#d6d6d6
| 391283 ||  || — || September 26, 2006 || Catalina || CSS || — || align=right | 2.9 km || 
|-id=284 bgcolor=#d6d6d6
| 391284 ||  || — || September 26, 2006 || Kitt Peak || Spacewatch || — || align=right | 2.6 km || 
|-id=285 bgcolor=#d6d6d6
| 391285 ||  || — || September 23, 2006 || Kitt Peak || Spacewatch || — || align=right | 3.0 km || 
|-id=286 bgcolor=#d6d6d6
| 391286 ||  || — || September 26, 2006 || Kitt Peak || Spacewatch || CHA || align=right | 1.9 km || 
|-id=287 bgcolor=#E9E9E9
| 391287 ||  || — || September 26, 2006 || Socorro || LINEAR || — || align=right | 1.8 km || 
|-id=288 bgcolor=#d6d6d6
| 391288 ||  || — || September 17, 2006 || Kitt Peak || Spacewatch || — || align=right | 2.6 km || 
|-id=289 bgcolor=#d6d6d6
| 391289 ||  || — || September 26, 2006 || Mount Lemmon || Mount Lemmon Survey || — || align=right | 2.4 km || 
|-id=290 bgcolor=#d6d6d6
| 391290 ||  || — || September 26, 2006 || Kitt Peak || Spacewatch || — || align=right | 2.7 km || 
|-id=291 bgcolor=#d6d6d6
| 391291 ||  || — || September 26, 2006 || Kitt Peak || Spacewatch || — || align=right | 2.7 km || 
|-id=292 bgcolor=#d6d6d6
| 391292 ||  || — || September 25, 2006 || Kitt Peak || Spacewatch || — || align=right | 2.2 km || 
|-id=293 bgcolor=#d6d6d6
| 391293 ||  || — || September 25, 2006 || Mount Lemmon || Mount Lemmon Survey || — || align=right | 2.3 km || 
|-id=294 bgcolor=#d6d6d6
| 391294 ||  || — || September 18, 2006 || Anderson Mesa || LONEOS || — || align=right | 4.5 km || 
|-id=295 bgcolor=#d6d6d6
| 391295 ||  || — || April 19, 2004 || Kitt Peak || Spacewatch || CHA || align=right | 2.1 km || 
|-id=296 bgcolor=#d6d6d6
| 391296 ||  || — || September 27, 2006 || Kitt Peak || Spacewatch || — || align=right | 3.0 km || 
|-id=297 bgcolor=#d6d6d6
| 391297 ||  || — || September 27, 2006 || Kitt Peak || Spacewatch || — || align=right | 2.6 km || 
|-id=298 bgcolor=#d6d6d6
| 391298 ||  || — || April 11, 2003 || Kitt Peak || Spacewatch || EUP || align=right | 3.6 km || 
|-id=299 bgcolor=#d6d6d6
| 391299 ||  || — || September 19, 2006 || Kitt Peak || Spacewatch || — || align=right | 2.6 km || 
|-id=300 bgcolor=#d6d6d6
| 391300 ||  || — || September 30, 2006 || Mount Lemmon || Mount Lemmon Survey || — || align=right | 2.8 km || 
|}

391301–391400 

|-bgcolor=#d6d6d6
| 391301 ||  || — || September 17, 2006 || Apache Point || A. C. Becker || — || align=right | 2.2 km || 
|-id=302 bgcolor=#d6d6d6
| 391302 ||  || — || September 18, 2006 || Apache Point || A. C. Becker || EOS || align=right | 1.9 km || 
|-id=303 bgcolor=#d6d6d6
| 391303 ||  || — || September 20, 2006 || Apache Point || A. C. Becker || — || align=right | 2.2 km || 
|-id=304 bgcolor=#d6d6d6
| 391304 ||  || — || September 29, 2006 || Apache Point || A. C. Becker || — || align=right | 2.7 km || 
|-id=305 bgcolor=#d6d6d6
| 391305 ||  || — || September 29, 2006 || Apache Point || A. C. Becker || — || align=right | 3.1 km || 
|-id=306 bgcolor=#d6d6d6
| 391306 ||  || — || September 30, 2006 || Mount Lemmon || Mount Lemmon Survey || — || align=right | 2.9 km || 
|-id=307 bgcolor=#d6d6d6
| 391307 ||  || — || September 25, 2006 || Mount Lemmon || Mount Lemmon Survey || EOS || align=right | 1.7 km || 
|-id=308 bgcolor=#fefefe
| 391308 ||  || — || September 18, 2006 || Kitt Peak || Spacewatch || — || align=right data-sort-value="0.70" | 700 m || 
|-id=309 bgcolor=#d6d6d6
| 391309 ||  || — || September 18, 2006 || Kitt Peak || Spacewatch || — || align=right | 2.8 km || 
|-id=310 bgcolor=#d6d6d6
| 391310 ||  || — || September 25, 2006 || Mount Lemmon || Mount Lemmon Survey || — || align=right | 3.1 km || 
|-id=311 bgcolor=#d6d6d6
| 391311 ||  || — || October 4, 2006 || Mount Lemmon || Mount Lemmon Survey || — || align=right | 3.4 km || 
|-id=312 bgcolor=#d6d6d6
| 391312 ||  || — || September 25, 2006 || Mount Lemmon || Mount Lemmon Survey || — || align=right | 3.0 km || 
|-id=313 bgcolor=#d6d6d6
| 391313 ||  || — || October 12, 2006 || Kitt Peak || Spacewatch || — || align=right | 2.7 km || 
|-id=314 bgcolor=#d6d6d6
| 391314 ||  || — || October 12, 2006 || Kitt Peak || Spacewatch || — || align=right | 2.8 km || 
|-id=315 bgcolor=#d6d6d6
| 391315 ||  || — || October 11, 2006 || Palomar || NEAT || — || align=right | 3.0 km || 
|-id=316 bgcolor=#fefefe
| 391316 ||  || — || October 11, 2006 || Palomar || NEAT || — || align=right data-sort-value="0.90" | 900 m || 
|-id=317 bgcolor=#fefefe
| 391317 ||  || — || October 13, 2006 || Kitt Peak || Spacewatch || — || align=right data-sort-value="0.54" | 540 m || 
|-id=318 bgcolor=#d6d6d6
| 391318 ||  || — || October 13, 2006 || Kitt Peak || Spacewatch || — || align=right | 3.2 km || 
|-id=319 bgcolor=#d6d6d6
| 391319 ||  || — || October 13, 2006 || Kitt Peak || Spacewatch || — || align=right | 4.2 km || 
|-id=320 bgcolor=#d6d6d6
| 391320 ||  || — || October 13, 2006 || Kitt Peak || Spacewatch || EOS || align=right | 2.0 km || 
|-id=321 bgcolor=#d6d6d6
| 391321 ||  || — || October 13, 2006 || Kitt Peak || Spacewatch || — || align=right | 3.4 km || 
|-id=322 bgcolor=#d6d6d6
| 391322 ||  || — || October 2, 2006 || Mount Lemmon || Mount Lemmon Survey || — || align=right | 2.4 km || 
|-id=323 bgcolor=#fefefe
| 391323 ||  || — || October 15, 2006 || Kitt Peak || Spacewatch || FLO || align=right data-sort-value="0.46" | 460 m || 
|-id=324 bgcolor=#d6d6d6
| 391324 ||  || — || October 15, 2006 || Kitt Peak || Spacewatch || TEL || align=right | 1.5 km || 
|-id=325 bgcolor=#d6d6d6
| 391325 ||  || — || October 2, 2006 || Kitt Peak || Spacewatch || EOS || align=right | 1.8 km || 
|-id=326 bgcolor=#d6d6d6
| 391326 ||  || — || October 1, 2006 || Apache Point || A. C. Becker || LIX || align=right | 3.2 km || 
|-id=327 bgcolor=#d6d6d6
| 391327 ||  || — || October 2, 2006 || Apache Point || A. C. Becker || — || align=right | 2.5 km || 
|-id=328 bgcolor=#d6d6d6
| 391328 ||  || — || October 12, 2006 || Apache Point || A. C. Becker || EOS || align=right | 1.4 km || 
|-id=329 bgcolor=#d6d6d6
| 391329 ||  || — || October 12, 2006 || Apache Point || A. C. Becker || — || align=right | 2.5 km || 
|-id=330 bgcolor=#d6d6d6
| 391330 ||  || — || October 2, 2006 || Mount Lemmon || Mount Lemmon Survey || — || align=right | 3.9 km || 
|-id=331 bgcolor=#E9E9E9
| 391331 ||  || — || October 16, 2006 || Kitt Peak || Spacewatch || — || align=right | 1.6 km || 
|-id=332 bgcolor=#d6d6d6
| 391332 ||  || — || October 2, 2006 || Mount Lemmon || Mount Lemmon Survey || — || align=right | 3.2 km || 
|-id=333 bgcolor=#d6d6d6
| 391333 ||  || — || October 17, 2006 || Mount Lemmon || Mount Lemmon Survey || EUP || align=right | 4.4 km || 
|-id=334 bgcolor=#d6d6d6
| 391334 ||  || — || October 16, 2006 || Kitt Peak || Spacewatch || HYG || align=right | 2.0 km || 
|-id=335 bgcolor=#d6d6d6
| 391335 ||  || — || October 16, 2006 || Kitt Peak || Spacewatch || HYG || align=right | 2.7 km || 
|-id=336 bgcolor=#d6d6d6
| 391336 ||  || — || October 16, 2006 || Kitt Peak || Spacewatch || EOS || align=right | 1.7 km || 
|-id=337 bgcolor=#d6d6d6
| 391337 ||  || — || September 25, 2006 || Kitt Peak || Spacewatch || EOS || align=right | 1.5 km || 
|-id=338 bgcolor=#d6d6d6
| 391338 ||  || — || October 17, 2006 || Kitt Peak || Spacewatch || EOS || align=right | 2.2 km || 
|-id=339 bgcolor=#fefefe
| 391339 ||  || — || October 17, 2006 || Mount Lemmon || Mount Lemmon Survey || — || align=right data-sort-value="0.83" | 830 m || 
|-id=340 bgcolor=#d6d6d6
| 391340 ||  || — || October 18, 2006 || Kitt Peak || Spacewatch || HYG || align=right | 2.2 km || 
|-id=341 bgcolor=#d6d6d6
| 391341 ||  || — || October 2, 2006 || Mount Lemmon || Mount Lemmon Survey || — || align=right | 2.3 km || 
|-id=342 bgcolor=#d6d6d6
| 391342 ||  || — || October 18, 2006 || Kitt Peak || Spacewatch || — || align=right | 2.9 km || 
|-id=343 bgcolor=#E9E9E9
| 391343 ||  || — || October 2, 2006 || Mount Lemmon || Mount Lemmon Survey || — || align=right | 2.2 km || 
|-id=344 bgcolor=#d6d6d6
| 391344 ||  || — || September 26, 2006 || Mount Lemmon || Mount Lemmon Survey || — || align=right | 2.2 km || 
|-id=345 bgcolor=#d6d6d6
| 391345 ||  || — || September 18, 2006 || Kitt Peak || Spacewatch || THM || align=right | 1.9 km || 
|-id=346 bgcolor=#d6d6d6
| 391346 ||  || — || October 21, 2006 || Mount Lemmon || Mount Lemmon Survey || EOS || align=right | 1.7 km || 
|-id=347 bgcolor=#d6d6d6
| 391347 ||  || — || September 17, 1995 || Kitt Peak || Spacewatch || — || align=right | 2.8 km || 
|-id=348 bgcolor=#d6d6d6
| 391348 ||  || — || October 23, 2006 || Kitt Peak || Spacewatch || — || align=right | 3.3 km || 
|-id=349 bgcolor=#d6d6d6
| 391349 ||  || — || October 28, 2006 || Jornada || D. S. Dixon || — || align=right | 3.0 km || 
|-id=350 bgcolor=#d6d6d6
| 391350 ||  || — || October 17, 2006 || Catalina || CSS || CHA || align=right | 2.7 km || 
|-id=351 bgcolor=#d6d6d6
| 391351 ||  || — || October 20, 2006 || Palomar || NEAT || — || align=right | 3.3 km || 
|-id=352 bgcolor=#d6d6d6
| 391352 ||  || — || October 3, 2006 || Mount Lemmon || Mount Lemmon Survey || — || align=right | 4.0 km || 
|-id=353 bgcolor=#d6d6d6
| 391353 ||  || — || September 27, 2006 || Mount Lemmon || Mount Lemmon Survey || MEL || align=right | 3.7 km || 
|-id=354 bgcolor=#d6d6d6
| 391354 ||  || — || October 28, 2006 || Kitt Peak || Spacewatch || HYG || align=right | 2.8 km || 
|-id=355 bgcolor=#d6d6d6
| 391355 ||  || — || October 27, 2006 || Mount Lemmon || Mount Lemmon Survey || THM || align=right | 2.0 km || 
|-id=356 bgcolor=#d6d6d6
| 391356 ||  || — || October 18, 2006 || Kitt Peak || Spacewatch || — || align=right | 2.7 km || 
|-id=357 bgcolor=#d6d6d6
| 391357 ||  || — || September 30, 2006 || Mount Lemmon || Mount Lemmon Survey || — || align=right | 2.7 km || 
|-id=358 bgcolor=#d6d6d6
| 391358 ||  || — || October 19, 2006 || Kitt Peak || M. W. Buie || — || align=right | 2.6 km || 
|-id=359 bgcolor=#d6d6d6
| 391359 ||  || — || October 21, 2006 || Apache Point || A. C. Becker || — || align=right | 2.7 km || 
|-id=360 bgcolor=#d6d6d6
| 391360 ||  || — || October 22, 2006 || Apache Point || A. C. Becker || — || align=right | 3.1 km || 
|-id=361 bgcolor=#d6d6d6
| 391361 ||  || — || November 11, 2006 || Mount Lemmon || Mount Lemmon Survey || — || align=right | 2.7 km || 
|-id=362 bgcolor=#d6d6d6
| 391362 ||  || — || October 16, 2006 || Kitt Peak || Spacewatch || — || align=right | 2.7 km || 
|-id=363 bgcolor=#d6d6d6
| 391363 ||  || — || November 11, 2006 || Mount Lemmon || Mount Lemmon Survey || — || align=right | 3.7 km || 
|-id=364 bgcolor=#d6d6d6
| 391364 ||  || — || November 11, 2006 || Kitt Peak || Spacewatch || — || align=right | 3.4 km || 
|-id=365 bgcolor=#d6d6d6
| 391365 ||  || — || October 21, 2006 || Mount Lemmon || Mount Lemmon Survey || — || align=right | 2.9 km || 
|-id=366 bgcolor=#d6d6d6
| 391366 ||  || — || November 11, 2006 || Mount Lemmon || Mount Lemmon Survey || — || align=right | 2.9 km || 
|-id=367 bgcolor=#d6d6d6
| 391367 ||  || — || November 13, 2006 || Kitt Peak || Spacewatch || — || align=right | 2.9 km || 
|-id=368 bgcolor=#d6d6d6
| 391368 ||  || — || November 14, 2006 || Kitt Peak || Spacewatch || HYG || align=right | 2.9 km || 
|-id=369 bgcolor=#d6d6d6
| 391369 ||  || — || November 15, 2006 || Kitt Peak || Spacewatch || — || align=right | 2.4 km || 
|-id=370 bgcolor=#d6d6d6
| 391370 ||  || — || November 15, 2006 || Kitt Peak || Spacewatch || — || align=right | 3.0 km || 
|-id=371 bgcolor=#d6d6d6
| 391371 ||  || — || November 15, 2006 || Kitt Peak || Spacewatch || — || align=right | 2.4 km || 
|-id=372 bgcolor=#d6d6d6
| 391372 ||  || — || November 1, 2006 || Kitt Peak || Spacewatch || EOS || align=right | 2.1 km || 
|-id=373 bgcolor=#d6d6d6
| 391373 ||  || — || November 20, 2006 || Great Shefford || P. Birtwhistle || — || align=right | 2.5 km || 
|-id=374 bgcolor=#fefefe
| 391374 ||  || — || November 16, 2006 || Kitt Peak || Spacewatch || FLO || align=right data-sort-value="0.67" | 670 m || 
|-id=375 bgcolor=#d6d6d6
| 391375 ||  || — || November 16, 2006 || Mount Lemmon || Mount Lemmon Survey || EOS || align=right | 2.0 km || 
|-id=376 bgcolor=#d6d6d6
| 391376 ||  || — || November 17, 2006 || Mount Lemmon || Mount Lemmon Survey || — || align=right | 3.3 km || 
|-id=377 bgcolor=#d6d6d6
| 391377 ||  || — || November 17, 2006 || Mount Lemmon || Mount Lemmon Survey || EOS || align=right | 2.3 km || 
|-id=378 bgcolor=#d6d6d6
| 391378 ||  || — || September 28, 2006 || Mount Lemmon || Mount Lemmon Survey || — || align=right | 2.9 km || 
|-id=379 bgcolor=#d6d6d6
| 391379 ||  || — || November 17, 2006 || Mount Lemmon || Mount Lemmon Survey || — || align=right | 3.2 km || 
|-id=380 bgcolor=#d6d6d6
| 391380 ||  || — || November 19, 2006 || Kitt Peak || Spacewatch || — || align=right | 2.7 km || 
|-id=381 bgcolor=#d6d6d6
| 391381 ||  || — || November 19, 2006 || Kitt Peak || Spacewatch || — || align=right | 3.4 km || 
|-id=382 bgcolor=#d6d6d6
| 391382 ||  || — || November 11, 2006 || Mount Lemmon || Mount Lemmon Survey || — || align=right | 2.4 km || 
|-id=383 bgcolor=#d6d6d6
| 391383 ||  || — || November 19, 2006 || Kitt Peak || Spacewatch || URS || align=right | 3.9 km || 
|-id=384 bgcolor=#d6d6d6
| 391384 ||  || — || November 18, 2006 || Mount Lemmon || Mount Lemmon Survey || URS || align=right | 5.1 km || 
|-id=385 bgcolor=#d6d6d6
| 391385 ||  || — || November 19, 2006 || Catalina || CSS || — || align=right | 3.8 km || 
|-id=386 bgcolor=#d6d6d6
| 391386 ||  || — || November 20, 2006 || Kitt Peak || Spacewatch || VER || align=right | 3.5 km || 
|-id=387 bgcolor=#d6d6d6
| 391387 ||  || — || November 23, 2006 || Kitt Peak || Spacewatch || — || align=right | 2.3 km || 
|-id=388 bgcolor=#d6d6d6
| 391388 ||  || — || October 20, 2006 || Mount Lemmon || Mount Lemmon Survey || EOS || align=right | 2.1 km || 
|-id=389 bgcolor=#d6d6d6
| 391389 ||  || — || October 31, 2006 || Mount Lemmon || Mount Lemmon Survey || — || align=right | 3.1 km || 
|-id=390 bgcolor=#d6d6d6
| 391390 ||  || — || November 23, 2006 || Mount Lemmon || Mount Lemmon Survey || — || align=right | 2.8 km || 
|-id=391 bgcolor=#d6d6d6
| 391391 ||  || — || November 23, 2006 || Mount Lemmon || Mount Lemmon Survey || MEL || align=right | 4.4 km || 
|-id=392 bgcolor=#d6d6d6
| 391392 ||  || — || November 10, 2006 || Kitt Peak || Spacewatch || EOS || align=right | 1.9 km || 
|-id=393 bgcolor=#d6d6d6
| 391393 ||  || — || December 21, 2006 || Mount Lemmon || Mount Lemmon Survey || EOS || align=right | 2.1 km || 
|-id=394 bgcolor=#d6d6d6
| 391394 ||  || — || December 13, 2006 || Mount Lemmon || Mount Lemmon Survey || — || align=right | 3.4 km || 
|-id=395 bgcolor=#fefefe
| 391395 ||  || — || January 10, 2007 || Mount Lemmon || Mount Lemmon Survey || — || align=right data-sort-value="0.75" | 750 m || 
|-id=396 bgcolor=#fefefe
| 391396 ||  || — || January 17, 2007 || Palomar || NEAT || — || align=right data-sort-value="0.75" | 750 m || 
|-id=397 bgcolor=#fefefe
| 391397 ||  || — || March 16, 2004 || Kitt Peak || Spacewatch || — || align=right data-sort-value="0.73" | 730 m || 
|-id=398 bgcolor=#fefefe
| 391398 ||  || — || January 17, 2007 || Kitt Peak || Spacewatch || — || align=right data-sort-value="0.87" | 870 m || 
|-id=399 bgcolor=#FA8072
| 391399 ||  || — || January 10, 2007 || Kitt Peak || Spacewatch || — || align=right data-sort-value="0.86" | 860 m || 
|-id=400 bgcolor=#fefefe
| 391400 ||  || — || April 13, 2004 || Kitt Peak || Spacewatch || — || align=right data-sort-value="0.62" | 620 m || 
|}

391401–391500 

|-bgcolor=#fefefe
| 391401 ||  || — || January 27, 2007 || Mount Lemmon || Mount Lemmon Survey || — || align=right data-sort-value="0.68" | 680 m || 
|-id=402 bgcolor=#fefefe
| 391402 ||  || — || February 6, 2007 || Kitt Peak || Spacewatch || — || align=right data-sort-value="0.69" | 690 m || 
|-id=403 bgcolor=#fefefe
| 391403 ||  || — || February 6, 2007 || Mount Lemmon || Mount Lemmon Survey || FLO || align=right data-sort-value="0.88" | 880 m || 
|-id=404 bgcolor=#fefefe
| 391404 ||  || — || February 6, 2007 || Palomar || NEAT || FLO || align=right data-sort-value="0.64" | 640 m || 
|-id=405 bgcolor=#fefefe
| 391405 ||  || — || February 6, 2007 || Mount Lemmon || Mount Lemmon Survey || — || align=right data-sort-value="0.74" | 740 m || 
|-id=406 bgcolor=#fefefe
| 391406 ||  || — || February 8, 2007 || Palomar || NEAT || — || align=right | 1.0 km || 
|-id=407 bgcolor=#fefefe
| 391407 ||  || — || February 13, 2007 || Socorro || LINEAR || FLO || align=right data-sort-value="0.70" | 700 m || 
|-id=408 bgcolor=#fefefe
| 391408 ||  || — || February 17, 2007 || Mount Lemmon || Mount Lemmon Survey || V || align=right data-sort-value="0.54" | 540 m || 
|-id=409 bgcolor=#fefefe
| 391409 ||  || — || February 17, 2007 || Kitt Peak || Spacewatch || — || align=right data-sort-value="0.87" | 870 m || 
|-id=410 bgcolor=#fefefe
| 391410 ||  || — || February 17, 2007 || Kitt Peak || Spacewatch || — || align=right data-sort-value="0.78" | 780 m || 
|-id=411 bgcolor=#fefefe
| 391411 ||  || — || February 17, 2007 || Kitt Peak || Spacewatch || — || align=right data-sort-value="0.65" | 650 m || 
|-id=412 bgcolor=#fefefe
| 391412 ||  || — || February 17, 2007 || Kitt Peak || Spacewatch || — || align=right data-sort-value="0.76" | 760 m || 
|-id=413 bgcolor=#fefefe
| 391413 ||  || — || February 17, 2007 || Kitt Peak || Spacewatch || — || align=right data-sort-value="0.64" | 640 m || 
|-id=414 bgcolor=#fefefe
| 391414 ||  || — || February 17, 2007 || Kitt Peak || Spacewatch || — || align=right data-sort-value="0.68" | 680 m || 
|-id=415 bgcolor=#fefefe
| 391415 ||  || — || February 17, 2007 || Kitt Peak || Spacewatch || — || align=right | 1.4 km || 
|-id=416 bgcolor=#fefefe
| 391416 ||  || — || February 21, 2007 || Kitt Peak || Spacewatch || V || align=right data-sort-value="0.71" | 710 m || 
|-id=417 bgcolor=#fefefe
| 391417 ||  || — || February 21, 2007 || Kitt Peak || Spacewatch || NYS || align=right | 2.0 km || 
|-id=418 bgcolor=#fefefe
| 391418 ||  || — || February 21, 2007 || Kitt Peak || Spacewatch || NYS || align=right data-sort-value="0.68" | 680 m || 
|-id=419 bgcolor=#fefefe
| 391419 ||  || — || February 23, 2007 || Mount Lemmon || Mount Lemmon Survey || — || align=right data-sort-value="0.67" | 670 m || 
|-id=420 bgcolor=#fefefe
| 391420 ||  || — || February 23, 2007 || Kitt Peak || Spacewatch || — || align=right data-sort-value="0.82" | 820 m || 
|-id=421 bgcolor=#fefefe
| 391421 ||  || — || February 25, 2007 || Mount Lemmon || Mount Lemmon Survey || NYS || align=right | 1.5 km || 
|-id=422 bgcolor=#fefefe
| 391422 ||  || — || February 26, 2007 || Mount Lemmon || Mount Lemmon Survey || MAS || align=right data-sort-value="0.62" | 620 m || 
|-id=423 bgcolor=#fefefe
| 391423 ||  || — || February 8, 2007 || Kitt Peak || Spacewatch || — || align=right | 1.0 km || 
|-id=424 bgcolor=#fefefe
| 391424 ||  || — || March 9, 2007 || Catalina || CSS || — || align=right data-sort-value="0.73" | 730 m || 
|-id=425 bgcolor=#fefefe
| 391425 ||  || — || March 10, 2007 || Mount Lemmon || Mount Lemmon Survey || — || align=right data-sort-value="0.78" | 780 m || 
|-id=426 bgcolor=#fefefe
| 391426 ||  || — || March 9, 2007 || Catalina || CSS || — || align=right data-sort-value="0.84" | 840 m || 
|-id=427 bgcolor=#fefefe
| 391427 ||  || — || March 10, 2007 || Kitt Peak || Spacewatch || NYS || align=right data-sort-value="0.66" | 660 m || 
|-id=428 bgcolor=#fefefe
| 391428 ||  || — || March 9, 2007 || Kitt Peak || Spacewatch || NYS || align=right data-sort-value="0.65" | 650 m || 
|-id=429 bgcolor=#fefefe
| 391429 ||  || — || November 1, 2005 || Mount Lemmon || Mount Lemmon Survey || NYS || align=right data-sort-value="0.69" | 690 m || 
|-id=430 bgcolor=#fefefe
| 391430 ||  || — || March 10, 2007 || Mount Lemmon || Mount Lemmon Survey || FLO || align=right data-sort-value="0.76" | 760 m || 
|-id=431 bgcolor=#fefefe
| 391431 ||  || — || March 10, 2007 || Kitt Peak || Spacewatch || NYS || align=right data-sort-value="0.64" | 640 m || 
|-id=432 bgcolor=#fefefe
| 391432 ||  || — || March 10, 2007 || Kitt Peak || Spacewatch || — || align=right data-sort-value="0.80" | 800 m || 
|-id=433 bgcolor=#fefefe
| 391433 ||  || — || March 10, 2007 || Kitt Peak || Spacewatch || V || align=right data-sort-value="0.68" | 680 m || 
|-id=434 bgcolor=#fefefe
| 391434 ||  || — || March 10, 2007 || Mount Lemmon || Mount Lemmon Survey || — || align=right data-sort-value="0.68" | 680 m || 
|-id=435 bgcolor=#fefefe
| 391435 ||  || — || March 11, 2007 || Kitt Peak || Spacewatch || NYS || align=right data-sort-value="0.60" | 600 m || 
|-id=436 bgcolor=#E9E9E9
| 391436 ||  || — || March 11, 2007 || Kitt Peak || Spacewatch || — || align=right | 2.0 km || 
|-id=437 bgcolor=#fefefe
| 391437 ||  || — || March 13, 2007 || Mount Lemmon || Mount Lemmon Survey || — || align=right data-sort-value="0.75" | 750 m || 
|-id=438 bgcolor=#fefefe
| 391438 ||  || — || February 23, 2007 || Mount Lemmon || Mount Lemmon Survey || — || align=right data-sort-value="0.82" | 820 m || 
|-id=439 bgcolor=#fefefe
| 391439 ||  || — || March 12, 2007 || Mount Lemmon || Mount Lemmon Survey || NYS || align=right data-sort-value="0.48" | 480 m || 
|-id=440 bgcolor=#fefefe
| 391440 ||  || — || February 26, 2007 || Mount Lemmon || Mount Lemmon Survey || — || align=right data-sort-value="0.77" | 770 m || 
|-id=441 bgcolor=#fefefe
| 391441 ||  || — || March 13, 2007 || Kitt Peak || Spacewatch || FLO || align=right data-sort-value="0.60" | 600 m || 
|-id=442 bgcolor=#fefefe
| 391442 ||  || — || March 14, 2007 || Kitt Peak || Spacewatch || NYS || align=right data-sort-value="0.70" | 700 m || 
|-id=443 bgcolor=#fefefe
| 391443 ||  || — || March 14, 2007 || Kitt Peak || Spacewatch || FLO || align=right data-sort-value="0.80" | 800 m || 
|-id=444 bgcolor=#fefefe
| 391444 ||  || — || March 13, 2007 || Mount Lemmon || Mount Lemmon Survey || NYS || align=right data-sort-value="0.51" | 510 m || 
|-id=445 bgcolor=#d6d6d6
| 391445 ||  || — || March 15, 2007 || Mount Lemmon || Mount Lemmon Survey || 3:2 || align=right | 5.3 km || 
|-id=446 bgcolor=#fefefe
| 391446 ||  || — || March 9, 2007 || Catalina || CSS || — || align=right | 1.0 km || 
|-id=447 bgcolor=#fefefe
| 391447 ||  || — || March 14, 2007 || Anderson Mesa || LONEOS || V || align=right data-sort-value="0.85" | 850 m || 
|-id=448 bgcolor=#fefefe
| 391448 ||  || — || March 12, 2007 || Catalina || CSS || FLO || align=right data-sort-value="0.75" | 750 m || 
|-id=449 bgcolor=#FFC2E0
| 391449 ||  || — || March 17, 2007 || Catalina || CSS || AMOcritical || align=right data-sort-value="0.71" | 710 m || 
|-id=450 bgcolor=#fefefe
| 391450 ||  || — || March 18, 2007 || Nyukasa || Mount Nyukasa Stn. || — || align=right | 1.2 km || 
|-id=451 bgcolor=#FFC2E0
| 391451 ||  || — || March 23, 2007 || Siding Spring || SSS || AMOcritical || align=right data-sort-value="0.45" | 450 m || 
|-id=452 bgcolor=#fefefe
| 391452 ||  || — || March 20, 2007 || Kitt Peak || Spacewatch || V || align=right data-sort-value="0.67" | 670 m || 
|-id=453 bgcolor=#fefefe
| 391453 ||  || — || March 20, 2007 || Kitt Peak || Spacewatch || — || align=right data-sort-value="0.72" | 720 m || 
|-id=454 bgcolor=#fefefe
| 391454 ||  || — || April 11, 2007 || Kitt Peak || Spacewatch || — || align=right data-sort-value="0.80" | 800 m || 
|-id=455 bgcolor=#fefefe
| 391455 ||  || — || April 11, 2007 || Mount Lemmon || Mount Lemmon Survey || FLO || align=right data-sort-value="0.57" | 570 m || 
|-id=456 bgcolor=#fefefe
| 391456 ||  || — || April 11, 2007 || Mount Lemmon || Mount Lemmon Survey || FLO || align=right data-sort-value="0.70" | 700 m || 
|-id=457 bgcolor=#fefefe
| 391457 ||  || — || April 14, 2007 || Kitt Peak || Spacewatch || — || align=right data-sort-value="0.90" | 900 m || 
|-id=458 bgcolor=#fefefe
| 391458 ||  || — || April 14, 2007 || Kitt Peak || Spacewatch || — || align=right data-sort-value="0.97" | 970 m || 
|-id=459 bgcolor=#fefefe
| 391459 ||  || — || April 14, 2007 || Kitt Peak || Spacewatch || NYS || align=right data-sort-value="0.93" | 930 m || 
|-id=460 bgcolor=#fefefe
| 391460 ||  || — || April 14, 2007 || Kitt Peak || Spacewatch || — || align=right | 1.0 km || 
|-id=461 bgcolor=#fefefe
| 391461 ||  || — || April 14, 2007 || Kitt Peak || Spacewatch || — || align=right data-sort-value="0.89" | 890 m || 
|-id=462 bgcolor=#fefefe
| 391462 ||  || — || April 15, 2007 || Kitt Peak || Spacewatch || V || align=right data-sort-value="0.58" | 580 m || 
|-id=463 bgcolor=#fefefe
| 391463 ||  || — || April 15, 2007 || Kitt Peak || Spacewatch || — || align=right data-sort-value="0.62" | 620 m || 
|-id=464 bgcolor=#fefefe
| 391464 ||  || — || April 15, 2007 || Mount Lemmon || Mount Lemmon Survey || — || align=right data-sort-value="0.68" | 680 m || 
|-id=465 bgcolor=#fefefe
| 391465 ||  || — || March 26, 2007 || Kitt Peak || Spacewatch || V || align=right data-sort-value="0.64" | 640 m || 
|-id=466 bgcolor=#fefefe
| 391466 ||  || — || April 15, 2007 || Kitt Peak || Spacewatch || — || align=right data-sort-value="0.94" | 940 m || 
|-id=467 bgcolor=#fefefe
| 391467 ||  || — || October 1, 2005 || Mount Lemmon || Mount Lemmon Survey || V || align=right data-sort-value="0.63" | 630 m || 
|-id=468 bgcolor=#fefefe
| 391468 ||  || — || April 18, 2007 || Kitt Peak || Spacewatch || — || align=right data-sort-value="0.72" | 720 m || 
|-id=469 bgcolor=#fefefe
| 391469 ||  || — || April 18, 2007 || Kitt Peak || Spacewatch || MAS || align=right data-sort-value="0.63" | 630 m || 
|-id=470 bgcolor=#fefefe
| 391470 ||  || — || March 13, 2007 || Mount Lemmon || Mount Lemmon Survey || — || align=right data-sort-value="0.98" | 980 m || 
|-id=471 bgcolor=#fefefe
| 391471 ||  || — || April 18, 2007 || Kitt Peak || Spacewatch || MAS || align=right data-sort-value="0.62" | 620 m || 
|-id=472 bgcolor=#fefefe
| 391472 ||  || — || April 19, 2007 || Mount Lemmon || Mount Lemmon Survey || NYS || align=right data-sort-value="0.68" | 680 m || 
|-id=473 bgcolor=#E9E9E9
| 391473 ||  || — || April 19, 2007 || Mount Lemmon || Mount Lemmon Survey || — || align=right | 1.2 km || 
|-id=474 bgcolor=#E9E9E9
| 391474 ||  || — || April 19, 2007 || Mount Lemmon || Mount Lemmon Survey || — || align=right | 3.7 km || 
|-id=475 bgcolor=#fefefe
| 391475 ||  || — || March 9, 2007 || Kitt Peak || Spacewatch || — || align=right | 1.0 km || 
|-id=476 bgcolor=#fefefe
| 391476 ||  || — || April 20, 2007 || Mount Lemmon || Mount Lemmon Survey || — || align=right data-sort-value="0.86" | 860 m || 
|-id=477 bgcolor=#fefefe
| 391477 ||  || — || October 17, 2001 || Kitt Peak || Spacewatch || — || align=right data-sort-value="0.75" | 750 m || 
|-id=478 bgcolor=#fefefe
| 391478 ||  || — || April 22, 2007 || Mount Lemmon || Mount Lemmon Survey || — || align=right data-sort-value="0.95" | 950 m || 
|-id=479 bgcolor=#fefefe
| 391479 ||  || — || March 24, 2003 || Kitt Peak || Spacewatch || FLO || align=right data-sort-value="0.66" | 660 m || 
|-id=480 bgcolor=#fefefe
| 391480 ||  || — || January 21, 1993 || Kitt Peak || Spacewatch || V || align=right data-sort-value="0.65" | 650 m || 
|-id=481 bgcolor=#fefefe
| 391481 ||  || — || December 4, 2005 || Kitt Peak || Spacewatch || — || align=right data-sort-value="0.88" | 880 m || 
|-id=482 bgcolor=#fefefe
| 391482 ||  || — || April 19, 2007 || Kitt Peak || Spacewatch || V || align=right data-sort-value="0.74" | 740 m || 
|-id=483 bgcolor=#fefefe
| 391483 ||  || — || May 6, 2007 || Kitt Peak || Spacewatch || — || align=right data-sort-value="0.91" | 910 m || 
|-id=484 bgcolor=#fefefe
| 391484 ||  || — || May 7, 2007 || Kitt Peak || Spacewatch || — || align=right | 1.2 km || 
|-id=485 bgcolor=#fefefe
| 391485 ||  || — || May 9, 2007 || Mount Lemmon || Mount Lemmon Survey || NYS || align=right data-sort-value="0.62" | 620 m || 
|-id=486 bgcolor=#fefefe
| 391486 ||  || — || May 7, 2007 || Kitt Peak || Spacewatch || NYS || align=right data-sort-value="0.60" | 600 m || 
|-id=487 bgcolor=#fefefe
| 391487 ||  || — || December 4, 2005 || Kitt Peak || Spacewatch || V || align=right data-sort-value="0.71" | 710 m || 
|-id=488 bgcolor=#fefefe
| 391488 ||  || — || May 11, 2007 || Siding Spring || SSS || ERI || align=right | 1.5 km || 
|-id=489 bgcolor=#fefefe
| 391489 ||  || — || June 8, 2007 || Catalina || CSS || — || align=right | 1.1 km || 
|-id=490 bgcolor=#fefefe
| 391490 ||  || — || June 8, 2007 || Kitt Peak || Spacewatch || — || align=right | 1.0 km || 
|-id=491 bgcolor=#fefefe
| 391491 ||  || — || June 14, 2007 || Kitt Peak || Spacewatch || — || align=right | 2.1 km || 
|-id=492 bgcolor=#fefefe
| 391492 ||  || — || June 24, 2007 || Tiki || S. F. Hönig, N. Teamo || — || align=right | 1.0 km || 
|-id=493 bgcolor=#E9E9E9
| 391493 ||  || — || July 21, 2007 || Siding Spring || SSS || — || align=right | 1.5 km || 
|-id=494 bgcolor=#E9E9E9
| 391494 ||  || — || July 18, 2007 || Mount Lemmon || Mount Lemmon Survey || — || align=right | 1.2 km || 
|-id=495 bgcolor=#fefefe
| 391495 ||  || — || July 18, 2007 || Mount Lemmon || Mount Lemmon Survey || ERI || align=right | 2.0 km || 
|-id=496 bgcolor=#fefefe
| 391496 ||  || — || August 11, 2007 || Shenton Park || P. Luckas || — || align=right | 3.0 km || 
|-id=497 bgcolor=#E9E9E9
| 391497 ||  || — || August 8, 2007 || Socorro || LINEAR || MAR || align=right | 1.6 km || 
|-id=498 bgcolor=#fefefe
| 391498 ||  || — || August 8, 2007 || Socorro || LINEAR || — || align=right | 1.2 km || 
|-id=499 bgcolor=#E9E9E9
| 391499 ||  || — || August 9, 2007 || Socorro || LINEAR || BRU || align=right | 3.0 km || 
|-id=500 bgcolor=#E9E9E9
| 391500 ||  || — || August 8, 2007 || Socorro || LINEAR || — || align=right | 2.6 km || 
|}

391501–391600 

|-bgcolor=#E9E9E9
| 391501 ||  || — || August 9, 2007 || Kitt Peak || Spacewatch || — || align=right | 2.1 km || 
|-id=502 bgcolor=#E9E9E9
| 391502 ||  || — || August 10, 2007 || Kitt Peak || Spacewatch || EUN || align=right | 1.3 km || 
|-id=503 bgcolor=#E9E9E9
| 391503 ||  || — || August 9, 2007 || Kitt Peak || Spacewatch || RAF || align=right | 1.0 km || 
|-id=504 bgcolor=#E9E9E9
| 391504 ||  || — || September 2, 2007 || Mount Lemmon || Mount Lemmon Survey || — || align=right | 1.8 km || 
|-id=505 bgcolor=#fefefe
| 391505 ||  || — || January 22, 2006 || Catalina || CSS || H || align=right data-sort-value="0.85" | 850 m || 
|-id=506 bgcolor=#fefefe
| 391506 ||  || — || September 5, 2007 || Siding Spring || K. Sárneczky, L. Kiss || H || align=right data-sort-value="0.54" | 540 m || 
|-id=507 bgcolor=#E9E9E9
| 391507 ||  || — || September 11, 2007 || Goodricke-Pigott || R. A. Tucker || — || align=right | 1.8 km || 
|-id=508 bgcolor=#FFC2E0
| 391508 ||  || — || September 13, 2007 || Mount Lemmon || Mount Lemmon Survey || APO || align=right data-sort-value="0.54" | 540 m || 
|-id=509 bgcolor=#E9E9E9
| 391509 ||  || — || September 9, 2007 || Kitt Peak || Spacewatch || GEF || align=right | 1.1 km || 
|-id=510 bgcolor=#E9E9E9
| 391510 ||  || — || August 10, 2007 || Kitt Peak || Spacewatch || — || align=right data-sort-value="0.97" | 970 m || 
|-id=511 bgcolor=#E9E9E9
| 391511 ||  || — || September 10, 2007 || Kitt Peak || Spacewatch || — || align=right data-sort-value="0.90" | 900 m || 
|-id=512 bgcolor=#d6d6d6
| 391512 ||  || — || September 10, 2007 || Kitt Peak || Spacewatch || — || align=right | 2.6 km || 
|-id=513 bgcolor=#E9E9E9
| 391513 ||  || — || September 10, 2007 || Mount Lemmon || Mount Lemmon Survey || — || align=right | 1.1 km || 
|-id=514 bgcolor=#E9E9E9
| 391514 ||  || — || September 11, 2007 || Kitt Peak || Spacewatch || PAD || align=right | 1.5 km || 
|-id=515 bgcolor=#E9E9E9
| 391515 ||  || — || September 12, 2007 || Catalina || CSS || — || align=right | 1.1 km || 
|-id=516 bgcolor=#E9E9E9
| 391516 ||  || — || September 14, 2007 || Mount Lemmon || Mount Lemmon Survey || — || align=right | 1.9 km || 
|-id=517 bgcolor=#E9E9E9
| 391517 ||  || — || September 10, 2007 || Kitt Peak || Spacewatch || WIT || align=right | 1.1 km || 
|-id=518 bgcolor=#E9E9E9
| 391518 ||  || — || September 10, 2007 || Kitt Peak || Spacewatch || — || align=right data-sort-value="0.92" | 920 m || 
|-id=519 bgcolor=#E9E9E9
| 391519 ||  || — || September 10, 2007 || Kitt Peak || Spacewatch || — || align=right | 1.9 km || 
|-id=520 bgcolor=#E9E9E9
| 391520 ||  || — || September 10, 2007 || Kitt Peak || Spacewatch || — || align=right | 1.1 km || 
|-id=521 bgcolor=#E9E9E9
| 391521 ||  || — || September 10, 2007 || Kitt Peak || Spacewatch || NEM || align=right | 2.8 km || 
|-id=522 bgcolor=#E9E9E9
| 391522 ||  || — || September 10, 2007 || Mount Lemmon || Mount Lemmon Survey || — || align=right | 2.5 km || 
|-id=523 bgcolor=#FA8072
| 391523 ||  || — || September 12, 2007 || Catalina || CSS || — || align=right | 1.0 km || 
|-id=524 bgcolor=#d6d6d6
| 391524 ||  || — || September 13, 2007 || Kitt Peak || Spacewatch || — || align=right | 1.8 km || 
|-id=525 bgcolor=#fefefe
| 391525 ||  || — || September 10, 2007 || Kitt Peak || Spacewatch || — || align=right data-sort-value="0.92" | 920 m || 
|-id=526 bgcolor=#E9E9E9
| 391526 ||  || — || September 12, 2007 || Kitt Peak || Spacewatch || — || align=right | 2.0 km || 
|-id=527 bgcolor=#fefefe
| 391527 ||  || — || September 14, 2007 || Mount Lemmon || Mount Lemmon Survey || H || align=right data-sort-value="0.85" | 850 m || 
|-id=528 bgcolor=#E9E9E9
| 391528 ||  || — || September 12, 2007 || Catalina || CSS || ADE || align=right | 2.1 km || 
|-id=529 bgcolor=#E9E9E9
| 391529 ||  || — || February 16, 2001 || Socorro || LINEAR || — || align=right | 1.9 km || 
|-id=530 bgcolor=#E9E9E9
| 391530 ||  || — || August 14, 2007 || Siding Spring || SSS || — || align=right | 3.2 km || 
|-id=531 bgcolor=#FA8072
| 391531 ||  || — || September 1, 2007 || Siding Spring || SSS || H || align=right data-sort-value="0.77" | 770 m || 
|-id=532 bgcolor=#E9E9E9
| 391532 ||  || — || September 8, 2007 || Cerro Tololo || L. H. Wasserman || BRU || align=right | 4.1 km || 
|-id=533 bgcolor=#E9E9E9
| 391533 ||  || — || September 10, 2007 || Kitt Peak || Spacewatch || — || align=right | 1.1 km || 
|-id=534 bgcolor=#E9E9E9
| 391534 ||  || — || September 9, 2007 || Mount Lemmon || Mount Lemmon Survey || — || align=right | 1.1 km || 
|-id=535 bgcolor=#d6d6d6
| 391535 ||  || — || September 12, 2007 || Mount Lemmon || Mount Lemmon Survey || — || align=right | 1.9 km || 
|-id=536 bgcolor=#C2FFFF
| 391536 ||  || — || September 10, 2007 || Mount Lemmon || Mount Lemmon Survey || L4 || align=right | 8.1 km || 
|-id=537 bgcolor=#fefefe
| 391537 ||  || — || September 12, 2007 || Catalina || CSS || H || align=right data-sort-value="0.83" | 830 m || 
|-id=538 bgcolor=#E9E9E9
| 391538 ||  || — || September 14, 2007 || Socorro || LINEAR || — || align=right | 2.5 km || 
|-id=539 bgcolor=#E9E9E9
| 391539 ||  || — || September 11, 2007 || Mount Lemmon || Mount Lemmon Survey || — || align=right | 2.0 km || 
|-id=540 bgcolor=#E9E9E9
| 391540 ||  || — || September 11, 2007 || Mount Lemmon || Mount Lemmon Survey || — || align=right | 1.9 km || 
|-id=541 bgcolor=#E9E9E9
| 391541 ||  || — || September 20, 2007 || Catalina || CSS || — || align=right | 2.5 km || 
|-id=542 bgcolor=#fefefe
| 391542 ||  || — || September 25, 2007 || Mount Lemmon || Mount Lemmon Survey || H || align=right data-sort-value="0.57" | 570 m || 
|-id=543 bgcolor=#E9E9E9
| 391543 ||  || — || September 25, 2007 || Mount Lemmon || Mount Lemmon Survey || — || align=right | 2.4 km || 
|-id=544 bgcolor=#E9E9E9
| 391544 ||  || — || September 25, 2007 || Mount Lemmon || Mount Lemmon Survey || — || align=right | 2.4 km || 
|-id=545 bgcolor=#fefefe
| 391545 ||  || — || October 4, 2007 || Siding Spring || SSS || H || align=right data-sort-value="0.75" | 750 m || 
|-id=546 bgcolor=#d6d6d6
| 391546 ||  || — || October 7, 2007 || Altschwendt || W. Ries || — || align=right | 2.3 km || 
|-id=547 bgcolor=#E9E9E9
| 391547 ||  || — || October 6, 2007 || Socorro || LINEAR || EUN || align=right | 1.7 km || 
|-id=548 bgcolor=#d6d6d6
| 391548 ||  || — || September 14, 2007 || Mount Lemmon || Mount Lemmon Survey || — || align=right | 2.5 km || 
|-id=549 bgcolor=#E9E9E9
| 391549 ||  || — || March 25, 2006 || Kitt Peak || Spacewatch || — || align=right data-sort-value="0.94" | 940 m || 
|-id=550 bgcolor=#d6d6d6
| 391550 ||  || — || October 4, 2007 || Kitt Peak || Spacewatch || CHA || align=right | 1.9 km || 
|-id=551 bgcolor=#d6d6d6
| 391551 ||  || — || October 4, 2007 || Kitt Peak || Spacewatch || — || align=right | 1.9 km || 
|-id=552 bgcolor=#E9E9E9
| 391552 ||  || — || October 4, 2007 || Kitt Peak || Spacewatch || — || align=right | 1.4 km || 
|-id=553 bgcolor=#E9E9E9
| 391553 ||  || — || September 14, 2007 || Kitt Peak || Spacewatch || — || align=right | 2.6 km || 
|-id=554 bgcolor=#d6d6d6
| 391554 ||  || — || October 6, 2007 || Kitt Peak || Spacewatch || LAU || align=right | 1.0 km || 
|-id=555 bgcolor=#E9E9E9
| 391555 ||  || — || October 7, 2007 || Mount Lemmon || Mount Lemmon Survey || — || align=right | 1.3 km || 
|-id=556 bgcolor=#fefefe
| 391556 ||  || — || October 9, 2007 || Socorro || LINEAR || H || align=right data-sort-value="0.77" | 770 m || 
|-id=557 bgcolor=#E9E9E9
| 391557 ||  || — || October 13, 2007 || Bergisch Gladbach || W. Bickel || — || align=right | 1.1 km || 
|-id=558 bgcolor=#E9E9E9
| 391558 ||  || — || October 7, 2007 || Mount Lemmon || Mount Lemmon Survey || — || align=right | 2.0 km || 
|-id=559 bgcolor=#E9E9E9
| 391559 ||  || — || October 8, 2007 || Mount Lemmon || Mount Lemmon Survey || — || align=right | 2.0 km || 
|-id=560 bgcolor=#fefefe
| 391560 ||  || — || October 17, 1996 || Kitt Peak || Spacewatch || PHO || align=right | 1.1 km || 
|-id=561 bgcolor=#E9E9E9
| 391561 ||  || — || October 6, 2007 || Kitt Peak || Spacewatch || — || align=right | 1.2 km || 
|-id=562 bgcolor=#d6d6d6
| 391562 ||  || — || October 7, 2007 || Mount Lemmon || Mount Lemmon Survey || K-2 || align=right | 1.2 km || 
|-id=563 bgcolor=#d6d6d6
| 391563 ||  || — || May 11, 2005 || Mount Lemmon || Mount Lemmon Survey || — || align=right | 2.5 km || 
|-id=564 bgcolor=#E9E9E9
| 391564 ||  || — || October 9, 2007 || Socorro || LINEAR || MAR || align=right | 1.5 km || 
|-id=565 bgcolor=#E9E9E9
| 391565 ||  || — || October 11, 2007 || Socorro || LINEAR || — || align=right | 1.4 km || 
|-id=566 bgcolor=#E9E9E9
| 391566 ||  || — || August 24, 2007 || Kitt Peak || Spacewatch || — || align=right | 1.7 km || 
|-id=567 bgcolor=#E9E9E9
| 391567 ||  || — || October 8, 2007 || Kitt Peak || Spacewatch || HEN || align=right data-sort-value="0.98" | 980 m || 
|-id=568 bgcolor=#E9E9E9
| 391568 ||  || — || October 8, 2007 || Mount Lemmon || Mount Lemmon Survey || — || align=right | 2.4 km || 
|-id=569 bgcolor=#E9E9E9
| 391569 ||  || — || October 7, 2007 || Kitt Peak || Spacewatch || — || align=right | 2.4 km || 
|-id=570 bgcolor=#E9E9E9
| 391570 ||  || — || October 8, 2007 || Kitt Peak || Spacewatch || AGN || align=right | 1.3 km || 
|-id=571 bgcolor=#d6d6d6
| 391571 ||  || — || October 8, 2007 || Kitt Peak || Spacewatch || — || align=right | 2.8 km || 
|-id=572 bgcolor=#d6d6d6
| 391572 ||  || — || September 14, 2007 || Mount Lemmon || Mount Lemmon Survey || KOR || align=right | 1.3 km || 
|-id=573 bgcolor=#E9E9E9
| 391573 ||  || — || October 9, 2007 || Mount Lemmon || Mount Lemmon Survey || — || align=right | 2.9 km || 
|-id=574 bgcolor=#E9E9E9
| 391574 ||  || — || October 7, 2007 || Mount Lemmon || Mount Lemmon Survey || AER || align=right | 1.1 km || 
|-id=575 bgcolor=#E9E9E9
| 391575 ||  || — || October 8, 2007 || Mount Lemmon || Mount Lemmon Survey || HEN || align=right | 1.5 km || 
|-id=576 bgcolor=#E9E9E9
| 391576 ||  || — || October 10, 2007 || Mount Lemmon || Mount Lemmon Survey || — || align=right data-sort-value="0.75" | 750 m || 
|-id=577 bgcolor=#E9E9E9
| 391577 ||  || — || October 9, 2007 || Kitt Peak || Spacewatch || — || align=right data-sort-value="0.99" | 990 m || 
|-id=578 bgcolor=#E9E9E9
| 391578 ||  || — || October 11, 2007 || Catalina || CSS || — || align=right | 1.7 km || 
|-id=579 bgcolor=#E9E9E9
| 391579 ||  || — || October 11, 2007 || Kitt Peak || Spacewatch || EUN || align=right | 1.3 km || 
|-id=580 bgcolor=#E9E9E9
| 391580 ||  || — || October 11, 2007 || Kitt Peak || Spacewatch || — || align=right | 2.2 km || 
|-id=581 bgcolor=#E9E9E9
| 391581 ||  || — || April 4, 2005 || Kitt Peak || Spacewatch || HNS || align=right | 1.1 km || 
|-id=582 bgcolor=#E9E9E9
| 391582 ||  || — || October 14, 2007 || Mount Lemmon || Mount Lemmon Survey || HOF || align=right | 3.1 km || 
|-id=583 bgcolor=#d6d6d6
| 391583 ||  || — || September 14, 2007 || Mount Lemmon || Mount Lemmon Survey || — || align=right | 2.9 km || 
|-id=584 bgcolor=#E9E9E9
| 391584 ||  || — || September 13, 2007 || Mount Lemmon || Mount Lemmon Survey || HEN || align=right data-sort-value="0.92" | 920 m || 
|-id=585 bgcolor=#E9E9E9
| 391585 ||  || — || September 19, 2007 || Kitt Peak || Spacewatch || — || align=right | 2.0 km || 
|-id=586 bgcolor=#E9E9E9
| 391586 ||  || — || October 14, 2007 || Kitt Peak || Spacewatch || — || align=right | 2.1 km || 
|-id=587 bgcolor=#E9E9E9
| 391587 ||  || — || October 13, 2007 || Kitt Peak || Spacewatch || WIT || align=right data-sort-value="0.96" | 960 m || 
|-id=588 bgcolor=#E9E9E9
| 391588 ||  || — || October 15, 2007 || Kitt Peak || Spacewatch || AGN || align=right | 1.1 km || 
|-id=589 bgcolor=#E9E9E9
| 391589 ||  || — || October 8, 2007 || Mount Lemmon || Mount Lemmon Survey || — || align=right | 2.0 km || 
|-id=590 bgcolor=#E9E9E9
| 391590 ||  || — || October 11, 2007 || Kitt Peak || Spacewatch || — || align=right | 2.4 km || 
|-id=591 bgcolor=#E9E9E9
| 391591 ||  || — || October 9, 2007 || Kitt Peak || Spacewatch || WIT || align=right | 1.2 km || 
|-id=592 bgcolor=#E9E9E9
| 391592 ||  || — || October 14, 2007 || Mount Lemmon || Mount Lemmon Survey || — || align=right | 2.7 km || 
|-id=593 bgcolor=#E9E9E9
| 391593 ||  || — || October 11, 2007 || Catalina || CSS || WIT || align=right | 1.4 km || 
|-id=594 bgcolor=#E9E9E9
| 391594 ||  || — || October 16, 2007 || Bisei SG Center || BATTeRS || — || align=right | 2.4 km || 
|-id=595 bgcolor=#FA8072
| 391595 ||  || — || October 18, 2007 || Socorro || LINEAR || — || align=right data-sort-value="0.38" | 380 m || 
|-id=596 bgcolor=#fefefe
| 391596 ||  || — || October 16, 2007 || Catalina || CSS || H || align=right data-sort-value="0.76" | 760 m || 
|-id=597 bgcolor=#E9E9E9
| 391597 ||  || — || October 16, 2007 || Mount Lemmon || Mount Lemmon Survey || — || align=right | 2.5 km || 
|-id=598 bgcolor=#E9E9E9
| 391598 ||  || — || September 17, 1998 || Caussols || ODAS || — || align=right | 2.5 km || 
|-id=599 bgcolor=#FA8072
| 391599 ||  || — || September 5, 2007 || Catalina || CSS || — || align=right | 1.4 km || 
|-id=600 bgcolor=#E9E9E9
| 391600 ||  || — || October 19, 2007 || Catalina || CSS || — || align=right | 1.2 km || 
|}

391601–391700 

|-bgcolor=#E9E9E9
| 391601 ||  || — || October 20, 2007 || Catalina || CSS || — || align=right | 1.6 km || 
|-id=602 bgcolor=#E9E9E9
| 391602 ||  || — || October 30, 2007 || Kitt Peak || Spacewatch || AGN || align=right | 1.2 km || 
|-id=603 bgcolor=#E9E9E9
| 391603 ||  || — || October 30, 2007 || Kitt Peak || Spacewatch || — || align=right | 2.1 km || 
|-id=604 bgcolor=#E9E9E9
| 391604 ||  || — || October 30, 2007 || Kitt Peak || Spacewatch || — || align=right | 1.5 km || 
|-id=605 bgcolor=#d6d6d6
| 391605 ||  || — || October 12, 2007 || Kitt Peak || Spacewatch || CHA || align=right | 1.5 km || 
|-id=606 bgcolor=#E9E9E9
| 391606 ||  || — || October 30, 2007 || Kitt Peak || Spacewatch || — || align=right | 1.8 km || 
|-id=607 bgcolor=#E9E9E9
| 391607 ||  || — || October 16, 2007 || Mount Lemmon || Mount Lemmon Survey || — || align=right | 3.1 km || 
|-id=608 bgcolor=#E9E9E9
| 391608 ||  || — || October 16, 2007 || Mount Lemmon || Mount Lemmon Survey || — || align=right | 2.5 km || 
|-id=609 bgcolor=#E9E9E9
| 391609 ||  || — || October 20, 2007 || Mount Lemmon || Mount Lemmon Survey || WIT || align=right data-sort-value="0.99" | 990 m || 
|-id=610 bgcolor=#E9E9E9
| 391610 ||  || — || October 20, 2007 || Mount Lemmon || Mount Lemmon Survey || — || align=right | 2.4 km || 
|-id=611 bgcolor=#d6d6d6
| 391611 ||  || — || October 16, 2007 || Catalina || CSS || — || align=right | 3.4 km || 
|-id=612 bgcolor=#E9E9E9
| 391612 ||  || — || October 18, 2007 || Kitt Peak || Spacewatch || EUN || align=right | 1.5 km || 
|-id=613 bgcolor=#E9E9E9
| 391613 ||  || — || November 2, 2007 || Dauban || Chante-Perdrix Obs. || — || align=right | 1.8 km || 
|-id=614 bgcolor=#E9E9E9
| 391614 ||  || — || November 2, 2007 || Mount Lemmon || Mount Lemmon Survey || — || align=right data-sort-value="0.84" | 840 m || 
|-id=615 bgcolor=#E9E9E9
| 391615 ||  || — || November 2, 2007 || Mount Lemmon || Mount Lemmon Survey || — || align=right | 1.7 km || 
|-id=616 bgcolor=#d6d6d6
| 391616 ||  || — || October 11, 2007 || Catalina || CSS || — || align=right | 3.5 km || 
|-id=617 bgcolor=#d6d6d6
| 391617 ||  || — || November 1, 2007 || Kitt Peak || Spacewatch || CHA || align=right | 2.3 km || 
|-id=618 bgcolor=#E9E9E9
| 391618 ||  || — || November 1, 2007 || Kitt Peak || Spacewatch || — || align=right | 1.5 km || 
|-id=619 bgcolor=#E9E9E9
| 391619 ||  || — || October 20, 2007 || Mount Lemmon || Mount Lemmon Survey || — || align=right | 2.6 km || 
|-id=620 bgcolor=#E9E9E9
| 391620 ||  || — || November 1, 2007 || Kitt Peak || Spacewatch || HOF || align=right | 2.5 km || 
|-id=621 bgcolor=#E9E9E9
| 391621 ||  || — || November 1, 2007 || Kitt Peak || Spacewatch || EUN || align=right | 1.5 km || 
|-id=622 bgcolor=#E9E9E9
| 391622 ||  || — || November 2, 2007 || Mount Lemmon || Mount Lemmon Survey || RAF || align=right data-sort-value="0.87" | 870 m || 
|-id=623 bgcolor=#E9E9E9
| 391623 ||  || — || November 2, 2007 || Kitt Peak || Spacewatch || HOF || align=right | 2.9 km || 
|-id=624 bgcolor=#fefefe
| 391624 ||  || — || November 2, 2007 || Mount Lemmon || Mount Lemmon Survey || H || align=right data-sort-value="0.79" | 790 m || 
|-id=625 bgcolor=#E9E9E9
| 391625 ||  || — || October 10, 2007 || Mount Lemmon || Mount Lemmon Survey || — || align=right | 1.9 km || 
|-id=626 bgcolor=#E9E9E9
| 391626 ||  || — || November 3, 2007 || Kitt Peak || Spacewatch || — || align=right | 1.4 km || 
|-id=627 bgcolor=#d6d6d6
| 391627 ||  || — || November 3, 2007 || Kitt Peak || Spacewatch || — || align=right | 2.5 km || 
|-id=628 bgcolor=#E9E9E9
| 391628 ||  || — || November 4, 2007 || Kitt Peak || Spacewatch || WIT || align=right | 1.1 km || 
|-id=629 bgcolor=#d6d6d6
| 391629 ||  || — || October 18, 2007 || Kitt Peak || Spacewatch || EOS || align=right | 1.7 km || 
|-id=630 bgcolor=#E9E9E9
| 391630 ||  || — || November 4, 2007 || Kitt Peak || Spacewatch || — || align=right | 2.0 km || 
|-id=631 bgcolor=#d6d6d6
| 391631 ||  || — || October 20, 2007 || Mount Lemmon || Mount Lemmon Survey || BRA || align=right | 1.9 km || 
|-id=632 bgcolor=#E9E9E9
| 391632 ||  || — || November 2, 2007 || Mount Lemmon || Mount Lemmon Survey || — || align=right | 2.4 km || 
|-id=633 bgcolor=#E9E9E9
| 391633 ||  || — || November 5, 2007 || Kitt Peak || Spacewatch || — || align=right | 2.4 km || 
|-id=634 bgcolor=#E9E9E9
| 391634 ||  || — || November 7, 2007 || Mount Lemmon || Mount Lemmon Survey || JUN || align=right | 1.2 km || 
|-id=635 bgcolor=#fefefe
| 391635 ||  || — || October 20, 2007 || Catalina || CSS || H || align=right data-sort-value="0.64" | 640 m || 
|-id=636 bgcolor=#d6d6d6
| 391636 ||  || — || November 9, 2007 || Kitt Peak || Spacewatch || KOR || align=right | 1.4 km || 
|-id=637 bgcolor=#E9E9E9
| 391637 ||  || — || November 7, 2007 || Kitt Peak || Spacewatch || AST || align=right | 1.5 km || 
|-id=638 bgcolor=#E9E9E9
| 391638 ||  || — || October 9, 2007 || Kitt Peak || Spacewatch || GER || align=right | 1.5 km || 
|-id=639 bgcolor=#E9E9E9
| 391639 ||  || — || November 11, 2007 || Mount Lemmon || Mount Lemmon Survey || BRU || align=right | 2.7 km || 
|-id=640 bgcolor=#E9E9E9
| 391640 ||  || — || November 7, 2007 || Kitt Peak || Spacewatch || MAR || align=right | 1.2 km || 
|-id=641 bgcolor=#FA8072
| 391641 ||  || — || November 13, 2007 || Catalina || CSS || H || align=right data-sort-value="0.98" | 980 m || 
|-id=642 bgcolor=#FA8072
| 391642 ||  || — || November 15, 2007 || Catalina || CSS || H || align=right data-sort-value="0.94" | 940 m || 
|-id=643 bgcolor=#E9E9E9
| 391643 ||  || — || November 7, 2007 || Kitt Peak || Spacewatch || ADE || align=right | 1.9 km || 
|-id=644 bgcolor=#E9E9E9
| 391644 ||  || — || October 16, 2007 || Mount Lemmon || Mount Lemmon Survey || — || align=right | 2.3 km || 
|-id=645 bgcolor=#d6d6d6
| 391645 ||  || — || November 3, 2007 || Kitt Peak || Spacewatch || — || align=right | 1.8 km || 
|-id=646 bgcolor=#d6d6d6
| 391646 ||  || — || November 14, 2007 || Catalina || CSS || Tj (2.94) || align=right | 3.5 km || 
|-id=647 bgcolor=#d6d6d6
| 391647 ||  || — || November 14, 2007 || Kitt Peak || Spacewatch || — || align=right | 2.2 km || 
|-id=648 bgcolor=#E9E9E9
| 391648 ||  || — || November 15, 2007 || Mount Lemmon || Mount Lemmon Survey || WIT || align=right data-sort-value="0.93" | 930 m || 
|-id=649 bgcolor=#d6d6d6
| 391649 ||  || — || November 14, 2007 || Kitt Peak || Spacewatch || EOS || align=right | 2.3 km || 
|-id=650 bgcolor=#d6d6d6
| 391650 ||  || — || November 9, 2007 || Mount Lemmon || Mount Lemmon Survey || THM || align=right | 2.4 km || 
|-id=651 bgcolor=#E9E9E9
| 391651 ||  || — || November 2, 2007 || Mount Lemmon || Mount Lemmon Survey || — || align=right | 2.1 km || 
|-id=652 bgcolor=#E9E9E9
| 391652 ||  || — || November 2, 2007 || Socorro || LINEAR || — || align=right | 3.2 km || 
|-id=653 bgcolor=#d6d6d6
| 391653 ||  || — || November 2, 2007 || Mount Lemmon || Mount Lemmon Survey || — || align=right | 3.9 km || 
|-id=654 bgcolor=#d6d6d6
| 391654 ||  || — || November 9, 2007 || Mount Lemmon || Mount Lemmon Survey || — || align=right | 3.1 km || 
|-id=655 bgcolor=#E9E9E9
| 391655 ||  || — || October 18, 2007 || Kitt Peak || Spacewatch || — || align=right | 2.9 km || 
|-id=656 bgcolor=#E9E9E9
| 391656 ||  || — || November 19, 2007 || Mount Lemmon || Mount Lemmon Survey || HOF || align=right | 2.0 km || 
|-id=657 bgcolor=#d6d6d6
| 391657 ||  || — || November 18, 2007 || Kitt Peak || Spacewatch || KOR || align=right | 1.5 km || 
|-id=658 bgcolor=#d6d6d6
| 391658 ||  || — || November 19, 2007 || Mount Lemmon || Mount Lemmon Survey || LIX || align=right | 3.8 km || 
|-id=659 bgcolor=#d6d6d6
| 391659 ||  || — || November 18, 2007 || Mount Lemmon || Mount Lemmon Survey || — || align=right | 6.7 km || 
|-id=660 bgcolor=#E9E9E9
| 391660 ||  || — || December 13, 2007 || Dauban || Chante-Perdrix Obs. || — || align=right | 2.5 km || 
|-id=661 bgcolor=#E9E9E9
| 391661 ||  || — || December 3, 2007 || Kitt Peak || Spacewatch || — || align=right | 3.3 km || 
|-id=662 bgcolor=#d6d6d6
| 391662 ||  || — || December 15, 2007 || Kitt Peak || Spacewatch || KOR || align=right | 1.5 km || 
|-id=663 bgcolor=#E9E9E9
| 391663 ||  || — || December 4, 2007 || Socorro || LINEAR || RAF || align=right | 1.2 km || 
|-id=664 bgcolor=#d6d6d6
| 391664 ||  || — || December 16, 2007 || Kitt Peak || Spacewatch || — || align=right | 4.1 km || 
|-id=665 bgcolor=#d6d6d6
| 391665 ||  || — || December 18, 2007 || Mount Lemmon || Mount Lemmon Survey || — || align=right | 2.6 km || 
|-id=666 bgcolor=#d6d6d6
| 391666 ||  || — || December 18, 2007 || Mount Lemmon || Mount Lemmon Survey || EOS || align=right | 1.4 km || 
|-id=667 bgcolor=#d6d6d6
| 391667 ||  || — || December 18, 2007 || Kitt Peak || Spacewatch || — || align=right | 3.0 km || 
|-id=668 bgcolor=#d6d6d6
| 391668 ||  || — || November 18, 2007 || Kitt Peak || Spacewatch || KOR || align=right | 1.4 km || 
|-id=669 bgcolor=#d6d6d6
| 391669 ||  || — || November 7, 2007 || Mount Lemmon || Mount Lemmon Survey || — || align=right | 3.4 km || 
|-id=670 bgcolor=#d6d6d6
| 391670 ||  || — || December 30, 2007 || Kitt Peak || Spacewatch || — || align=right | 2.8 km || 
|-id=671 bgcolor=#fefefe
| 391671 ||  || — || December 31, 2007 || Catalina || CSS || H || align=right data-sort-value="0.61" | 610 m || 
|-id=672 bgcolor=#d6d6d6
| 391672 ||  || — || December 14, 2007 || Mount Lemmon || Mount Lemmon Survey || — || align=right | 3.0 km || 
|-id=673 bgcolor=#d6d6d6
| 391673 ||  || — || January 10, 2008 || Mount Lemmon || Mount Lemmon Survey || — || align=right | 2.8 km || 
|-id=674 bgcolor=#d6d6d6
| 391674 ||  || — || November 8, 2007 || Mount Lemmon || Mount Lemmon Survey || — || align=right | 3.3 km || 
|-id=675 bgcolor=#d6d6d6
| 391675 ||  || — || January 10, 2008 || Kitt Peak || Spacewatch || HYG || align=right | 2.6 km || 
|-id=676 bgcolor=#d6d6d6
| 391676 ||  || — || January 10, 2008 || Kitt Peak || Spacewatch || — || align=right | 2.7 km || 
|-id=677 bgcolor=#d6d6d6
| 391677 ||  || — || January 14, 2002 || Socorro || LINEAR || — || align=right | 3.7 km || 
|-id=678 bgcolor=#d6d6d6
| 391678 ||  || — || January 10, 2008 || Mount Lemmon || Mount Lemmon Survey || EUP || align=right | 3.3 km || 
|-id=679 bgcolor=#d6d6d6
| 391679 ||  || — || January 10, 2008 || Mount Lemmon || Mount Lemmon Survey || THB || align=right | 3.1 km || 
|-id=680 bgcolor=#d6d6d6
| 391680 ||  || — || November 4, 2007 || Mount Lemmon || Mount Lemmon Survey || — || align=right | 3.3 km || 
|-id=681 bgcolor=#d6d6d6
| 391681 ||  || — || January 10, 2008 || Mount Lemmon || Mount Lemmon Survey || — || align=right | 3.3 km || 
|-id=682 bgcolor=#d6d6d6
| 391682 ||  || — || November 11, 2007 || Mount Lemmon || Mount Lemmon Survey || — || align=right | 2.8 km || 
|-id=683 bgcolor=#d6d6d6
| 391683 ||  || — || January 11, 2008 || Kitt Peak || Spacewatch || — || align=right | 2.2 km || 
|-id=684 bgcolor=#d6d6d6
| 391684 ||  || — || January 11, 2008 || Kitt Peak || Spacewatch || — || align=right | 3.1 km || 
|-id=685 bgcolor=#d6d6d6
| 391685 ||  || — || January 11, 2008 || Mount Lemmon || Mount Lemmon Survey || — || align=right | 2.5 km || 
|-id=686 bgcolor=#d6d6d6
| 391686 ||  || — || January 11, 2008 || Kitt Peak || Spacewatch || — || align=right | 2.2 km || 
|-id=687 bgcolor=#d6d6d6
| 391687 ||  || — || January 13, 2008 || Kitt Peak || Spacewatch || — || align=right | 2.4 km || 
|-id=688 bgcolor=#d6d6d6
| 391688 ||  || — || January 13, 2008 || Kitt Peak || Spacewatch || — || align=right | 2.3 km || 
|-id=689 bgcolor=#d6d6d6
| 391689 ||  || — || December 30, 2007 || Kitt Peak || Spacewatch || — || align=right | 3.0 km || 
|-id=690 bgcolor=#d6d6d6
| 391690 ||  || — || January 14, 2008 || Kitt Peak || Spacewatch || THM || align=right | 2.1 km || 
|-id=691 bgcolor=#d6d6d6
| 391691 ||  || — || November 11, 2007 || Mount Lemmon || Mount Lemmon Survey || — || align=right | 2.5 km || 
|-id=692 bgcolor=#d6d6d6
| 391692 ||  || — || December 20, 2007 || Kitt Peak || Spacewatch || — || align=right | 2.3 km || 
|-id=693 bgcolor=#d6d6d6
| 391693 ||  || — || December 14, 2007 || Mount Lemmon || Mount Lemmon Survey || — || align=right | 2.8 km || 
|-id=694 bgcolor=#d6d6d6
| 391694 ||  || — || January 1, 2008 || Kitt Peak || Spacewatch || HYG || align=right | 2.5 km || 
|-id=695 bgcolor=#d6d6d6
| 391695 ||  || — || January 1, 2008 || Kitt Peak || Spacewatch || — || align=right | 2.2 km || 
|-id=696 bgcolor=#d6d6d6
| 391696 ||  || — || January 14, 2008 || Kitt Peak || Spacewatch || EOS || align=right | 2.0 km || 
|-id=697 bgcolor=#d6d6d6
| 391697 ||  || — || January 11, 2008 || Catalina || CSS || — || align=right | 2.8 km || 
|-id=698 bgcolor=#d6d6d6
| 391698 ||  || — || January 11, 2008 || Kitt Peak || Spacewatch || — || align=right | 2.9 km || 
|-id=699 bgcolor=#d6d6d6
| 391699 ||  || — || January 15, 2008 || Socorro || LINEAR || — || align=right | 3.2 km || 
|-id=700 bgcolor=#d6d6d6
| 391700 ||  || — || January 18, 2008 || Mount Lemmon || Mount Lemmon Survey || — || align=right | 2.5 km || 
|}

391701–391800 

|-bgcolor=#d6d6d6
| 391701 ||  || — || January 28, 2008 || Lulin Observatory || LUSS || — || align=right | 3.1 km || 
|-id=702 bgcolor=#d6d6d6
| 391702 ||  || — || December 14, 2007 || Mount Lemmon || Mount Lemmon Survey || — || align=right | 3.4 km || 
|-id=703 bgcolor=#d6d6d6
| 391703 ||  || — || January 12, 2008 || Kitt Peak || Spacewatch || — || align=right | 3.1 km || 
|-id=704 bgcolor=#d6d6d6
| 391704 ||  || — || October 26, 2007 || Mount Lemmon || Mount Lemmon Survey || — || align=right | 3.5 km || 
|-id=705 bgcolor=#d6d6d6
| 391705 ||  || — || January 20, 2008 || Kitt Peak || Spacewatch || — || align=right | 3.1 km || 
|-id=706 bgcolor=#d6d6d6
| 391706 ||  || — || February 1, 2008 || Catalina || CSS || — || align=right | 3.4 km || 
|-id=707 bgcolor=#d6d6d6
| 391707 ||  || — || February 2, 2008 || Kitt Peak || Spacewatch || — || align=right | 2.8 km || 
|-id=708 bgcolor=#d6d6d6
| 391708 ||  || — || February 2, 2008 || Kitt Peak || Spacewatch || EUP || align=right | 4.8 km || 
|-id=709 bgcolor=#d6d6d6
| 391709 ||  || — || February 3, 2008 || Kitt Peak || Spacewatch || EOS || align=right | 2.1 km || 
|-id=710 bgcolor=#d6d6d6
| 391710 ||  || — || February 3, 2008 || Kitt Peak || Spacewatch || — || align=right | 3.4 km || 
|-id=711 bgcolor=#d6d6d6
| 391711 ||  || — || February 3, 2008 || Kitt Peak || Spacewatch || THM || align=right | 2.3 km || 
|-id=712 bgcolor=#d6d6d6
| 391712 ||  || — || February 3, 2008 || Kitt Peak || Spacewatch || — || align=right | 2.8 km || 
|-id=713 bgcolor=#d6d6d6
| 391713 ||  || — || January 10, 2008 || Mount Lemmon || Mount Lemmon Survey || — || align=right | 3.0 km || 
|-id=714 bgcolor=#d6d6d6
| 391714 ||  || — || February 2, 2008 || Kitt Peak || Spacewatch || — || align=right | 2.5 km || 
|-id=715 bgcolor=#d6d6d6
| 391715 ||  || — || February 6, 2008 || Catalina || CSS || — || align=right | 3.5 km || 
|-id=716 bgcolor=#d6d6d6
| 391716 ||  || — || February 6, 2008 || Catalina || CSS || — || align=right | 3.2 km || 
|-id=717 bgcolor=#d6d6d6
| 391717 ||  || — || February 6, 2008 || Catalina || CSS || LIX || align=right | 3.8 km || 
|-id=718 bgcolor=#d6d6d6
| 391718 ||  || — || November 7, 2007 || Mount Lemmon || Mount Lemmon Survey || — || align=right | 2.6 km || 
|-id=719 bgcolor=#d6d6d6
| 391719 ||  || — || February 6, 2008 || Socorro || LINEAR || — || align=right | 3.9 km || 
|-id=720 bgcolor=#d6d6d6
| 391720 ||  || — || February 6, 2008 || Catalina || CSS || — || align=right | 3.1 km || 
|-id=721 bgcolor=#d6d6d6
| 391721 ||  || — || January 11, 2008 || Mount Lemmon || Mount Lemmon Survey || HYG || align=right | 2.8 km || 
|-id=722 bgcolor=#d6d6d6
| 391722 ||  || — || February 7, 2008 || Kitt Peak || Spacewatch || EOS || align=right | 2.3 km || 
|-id=723 bgcolor=#d6d6d6
| 391723 ||  || — || February 7, 2008 || Mount Lemmon || Mount Lemmon Survey || — || align=right | 3.4 km || 
|-id=724 bgcolor=#d6d6d6
| 391724 ||  || — || March 23, 2003 || Kitt Peak || Spacewatch || — || align=right | 2.9 km || 
|-id=725 bgcolor=#d6d6d6
| 391725 ||  || — || February 10, 2008 || Kitt Peak || Spacewatch || — || align=right | 3.3 km || 
|-id=726 bgcolor=#d6d6d6
| 391726 ||  || — || September 11, 2005 || Kitt Peak || Spacewatch || — || align=right | 2.9 km || 
|-id=727 bgcolor=#d6d6d6
| 391727 ||  || — || February 8, 2008 || Kitt Peak || Spacewatch || — || align=right | 3.1 km || 
|-id=728 bgcolor=#d6d6d6
| 391728 ||  || — || February 9, 2008 || Kitt Peak || Spacewatch || VER || align=right | 3.0 km || 
|-id=729 bgcolor=#d6d6d6
| 391729 ||  || — || February 9, 2008 || Kitt Peak || Spacewatch || EOS || align=right | 1.9 km || 
|-id=730 bgcolor=#d6d6d6
| 391730 ||  || — || February 9, 2008 || Kitt Peak || Spacewatch || HYG || align=right | 2.3 km || 
|-id=731 bgcolor=#d6d6d6
| 391731 ||  || — || February 9, 2008 || Kitt Peak || Spacewatch || — || align=right | 3.1 km || 
|-id=732 bgcolor=#d6d6d6
| 391732 ||  || — || February 11, 2008 || Mount Lemmon || Mount Lemmon Survey || HYG || align=right | 2.5 km || 
|-id=733 bgcolor=#d6d6d6
| 391733 ||  || — || February 13, 2008 || Mount Lemmon || Mount Lemmon Survey || — || align=right | 2.4 km || 
|-id=734 bgcolor=#d6d6d6
| 391734 ||  || — || February 13, 2008 || Catalina || CSS || — || align=right | 4.6 km || 
|-id=735 bgcolor=#d6d6d6
| 391735 ||  || — || February 2, 2008 || Mount Lemmon || Mount Lemmon Survey || — || align=right | 2.6 km || 
|-id=736 bgcolor=#d6d6d6
| 391736 ||  || — || February 8, 2008 || Kitt Peak || Spacewatch || — || align=right | 2.5 km || 
|-id=737 bgcolor=#d6d6d6
| 391737 ||  || — || February 7, 2008 || Kitt Peak || Spacewatch || — || align=right | 3.0 km || 
|-id=738 bgcolor=#d6d6d6
| 391738 ||  || — || February 13, 2008 || Mount Lemmon || Mount Lemmon Survey || THM || align=right | 2.2 km || 
|-id=739 bgcolor=#d6d6d6
| 391739 ||  || — || February 9, 2008 || Mount Lemmon || Mount Lemmon Survey || — || align=right | 3.1 km || 
|-id=740 bgcolor=#d6d6d6
| 391740 ||  || — || February 2, 2008 || Kitt Peak || Spacewatch || EOS || align=right | 1.8 km || 
|-id=741 bgcolor=#d6d6d6
| 391741 ||  || — || February 8, 2008 || Kitt Peak || Spacewatch || — || align=right | 2.5 km || 
|-id=742 bgcolor=#d6d6d6
| 391742 ||  || — || February 11, 2008 || Mount Lemmon || Mount Lemmon Survey || HYG || align=right | 3.0 km || 
|-id=743 bgcolor=#d6d6d6
| 391743 ||  || — || December 31, 2007 || Kitt Peak || Spacewatch || — || align=right | 2.2 km || 
|-id=744 bgcolor=#d6d6d6
| 391744 ||  || — || February 25, 2008 || Kitt Peak || Spacewatch || EOS || align=right | 2.0 km || 
|-id=745 bgcolor=#d6d6d6
| 391745 ||  || — || February 26, 2008 || Kitt Peak || Spacewatch || — || align=right | 2.5 km || 
|-id=746 bgcolor=#d6d6d6
| 391746 ||  || — || February 26, 2008 || Kitt Peak || Spacewatch || TIR || align=right | 2.4 km || 
|-id=747 bgcolor=#d6d6d6
| 391747 ||  || — || December 31, 2007 || Mount Lemmon || Mount Lemmon Survey || — || align=right | 2.9 km || 
|-id=748 bgcolor=#d6d6d6
| 391748 ||  || — || February 25, 2008 || Mount Lemmon || Mount Lemmon Survey || — || align=right | 3.4 km || 
|-id=749 bgcolor=#d6d6d6
| 391749 ||  || — || February 28, 2008 || Kitt Peak || Spacewatch || — || align=right | 3.2 km || 
|-id=750 bgcolor=#d6d6d6
| 391750 ||  || — || February 29, 2008 || Catalina || CSS || MEL || align=right | 3.9 km || 
|-id=751 bgcolor=#d6d6d6
| 391751 ||  || — || February 13, 2008 || Kitt Peak || Spacewatch || EOS || align=right | 2.0 km || 
|-id=752 bgcolor=#d6d6d6
| 391752 ||  || — || February 6, 2008 || Catalina || CSS || — || align=right | 3.2 km || 
|-id=753 bgcolor=#d6d6d6
| 391753 ||  || — || February 28, 2008 || Mount Lemmon || Mount Lemmon Survey || — || align=right | 4.1 km || 
|-id=754 bgcolor=#d6d6d6
| 391754 ||  || — || February 13, 2008 || Mount Lemmon || Mount Lemmon Survey || — || align=right | 3.6 km || 
|-id=755 bgcolor=#d6d6d6
| 391755 ||  || — || February 13, 2008 || Mount Lemmon || Mount Lemmon Survey || — || align=right | 3.0 km || 
|-id=756 bgcolor=#d6d6d6
| 391756 ||  || — || March 3, 2008 || Kitt Peak || Spacewatch || EUP || align=right | 3.9 km || 
|-id=757 bgcolor=#d6d6d6
| 391757 ||  || — || March 6, 2008 || Kitt Peak || Spacewatch || LIX || align=right | 4.5 km || 
|-id=758 bgcolor=#d6d6d6
| 391758 ||  || — || March 7, 2008 || Kitt Peak || Spacewatch || VER || align=right | 2.6 km || 
|-id=759 bgcolor=#d6d6d6
| 391759 ||  || — || March 9, 2008 || Antares || ARO || — || align=right | 3.6 km || 
|-id=760 bgcolor=#d6d6d6
| 391760 ||  || — || March 6, 2008 || Mount Lemmon || Mount Lemmon Survey || — || align=right | 3.0 km || 
|-id=761 bgcolor=#d6d6d6
| 391761 ||  || — || March 6, 2008 || Mount Lemmon || Mount Lemmon Survey || — || align=right | 2.9 km || 
|-id=762 bgcolor=#d6d6d6
| 391762 ||  || — || March 11, 2008 || Kitt Peak || Spacewatch || — || align=right | 3.1 km || 
|-id=763 bgcolor=#d6d6d6
| 391763 ||  || — || August 3, 2004 || Siding Spring || SSS || HYG || align=right | 3.1 km || 
|-id=764 bgcolor=#d6d6d6
| 391764 ||  || — || March 11, 2008 || Kitt Peak || Spacewatch || — || align=right | 3.2 km || 
|-id=765 bgcolor=#d6d6d6
| 391765 ||  || — || February 8, 2008 || Mount Lemmon || Mount Lemmon Survey || THM || align=right | 2.1 km || 
|-id=766 bgcolor=#d6d6d6
| 391766 || 2008 FA || — || March 19, 2008 || Wrightwood || J. W. Young || Tj (2.93) || align=right | 5.5 km || 
|-id=767 bgcolor=#d6d6d6
| 391767 ||  || — || March 26, 2008 || Kitt Peak || Spacewatch || — || align=right | 3.7 km || 
|-id=768 bgcolor=#d6d6d6
| 391768 ||  || — || March 28, 2008 || Kitt Peak || Spacewatch || — || align=right | 2.8 km || 
|-id=769 bgcolor=#d6d6d6
| 391769 ||  || — || October 10, 1999 || Kitt Peak || Spacewatch || — || align=right | 3.5 km || 
|-id=770 bgcolor=#d6d6d6
| 391770 ||  || — || March 26, 2008 || Mount Lemmon || Mount Lemmon Survey || THM || align=right | 2.2 km || 
|-id=771 bgcolor=#d6d6d6
| 391771 ||  || — || April 1, 2008 || Catalina || CSS || Tj (2.86) || align=right | 3.7 km || 
|-id=772 bgcolor=#d6d6d6
| 391772 ||  || — || April 6, 2008 || Kitt Peak || Spacewatch || 7:4 || align=right | 4.4 km || 
|-id=773 bgcolor=#fefefe
| 391773 ||  || — || April 26, 2008 || Kitt Peak || Spacewatch || — || align=right data-sort-value="0.75" | 750 m || 
|-id=774 bgcolor=#d6d6d6
| 391774 ||  || — || May 27, 2008 || Kitt Peak || Spacewatch || — || align=right | 3.4 km || 
|-id=775 bgcolor=#E9E9E9
| 391775 ||  || — || April 6, 2008 || Mount Lemmon || Mount Lemmon Survey || — || align=right | 1.8 km || 
|-id=776 bgcolor=#E9E9E9
| 391776 ||  || — || July 29, 2008 || Mount Lemmon || Mount Lemmon Survey || — || align=right | 2.2 km || 
|-id=777 bgcolor=#fefefe
| 391777 || 2008 PO || — || August 1, 2008 || Dauban || F. Kugel || — || align=right data-sort-value="0.81" | 810 m || 
|-id=778 bgcolor=#fefefe
| 391778 ||  || — || August 6, 2008 || Hibiscus || S. F. Hönig, N. Teamo || FLO || align=right data-sort-value="0.64" | 640 m || 
|-id=779 bgcolor=#E9E9E9
| 391779 ||  || — || August 5, 2008 || La Sagra || OAM Obs. || — || align=right | 3.2 km || 
|-id=780 bgcolor=#fefefe
| 391780 ||  || — || August 10, 2008 || Dauban || F. Kugel || FLO || align=right data-sort-value="0.62" | 620 m || 
|-id=781 bgcolor=#fefefe
| 391781 ||  || — || August 6, 2008 || La Sagra || OAM Obs. || FLO || align=right data-sort-value="0.80" | 800 m || 
|-id=782 bgcolor=#fefefe
| 391782 ||  || — || August 1, 2008 || Socorro || LINEAR || — || align=right | 1.1 km || 
|-id=783 bgcolor=#E9E9E9
| 391783 ||  || — || August 26, 2008 || La Sagra || OAM Obs. || — || align=right | 1.4 km || 
|-id=784 bgcolor=#fefefe
| 391784 ||  || — || August 28, 2008 || Dauban || F. Kugel || V || align=right data-sort-value="0.65" | 650 m || 
|-id=785 bgcolor=#fefefe
| 391785 ||  || — || July 28, 2008 || Mount Lemmon || Mount Lemmon Survey || — || align=right data-sort-value="0.94" | 940 m || 
|-id=786 bgcolor=#fefefe
| 391786 ||  || — || August 26, 2008 || Socorro || LINEAR || — || align=right data-sort-value="0.96" | 960 m || 
|-id=787 bgcolor=#fefefe
| 391787 ||  || — || August 26, 2008 || Socorro || LINEAR || — || align=right data-sort-value="0.94" | 940 m || 
|-id=788 bgcolor=#E9E9E9
| 391788 ||  || — || December 2, 2004 || Kitt Peak || Spacewatch || — || align=right | 1.6 km || 
|-id=789 bgcolor=#fefefe
| 391789 ||  || — || September 8, 2008 || Siding Spring || SSS || — || align=right | 1.4 km || 
|-id=790 bgcolor=#C2FFFF
| 391790 ||  || — || September 2, 2008 || Kitt Peak || Spacewatch || L4 || align=right | 8.7 km || 
|-id=791 bgcolor=#fefefe
| 391791 ||  || — || September 4, 2008 || Kitt Peak || Spacewatch || — || align=right data-sort-value="0.67" | 670 m || 
|-id=792 bgcolor=#C2FFFF
| 391792 ||  || — || September 5, 2008 || Kitt Peak || Spacewatch || L4ERY || align=right | 8.3 km || 
|-id=793 bgcolor=#fefefe
| 391793 ||  || — || September 6, 2008 || Catalina || CSS || — || align=right data-sort-value="0.93" | 930 m || 
|-id=794 bgcolor=#fefefe
| 391794 ||  || — || September 6, 2008 || Catalina || CSS || V || align=right data-sort-value="0.75" | 750 m || 
|-id=795 bgcolor=#E9E9E9
| 391795 Univofutah ||  ||  || September 8, 2008 || Tooele || P. Wiggins || — || align=right | 2.7 km || 
|-id=796 bgcolor=#fefefe
| 391796 ||  || — || September 10, 2008 || Wrightwood || J. W. Young || — || align=right data-sort-value="0.90" | 900 m || 
|-id=797 bgcolor=#fefefe
| 391797 ||  || — || September 5, 2008 || Kitt Peak || Spacewatch || FLO || align=right data-sort-value="0.72" | 720 m || 
|-id=798 bgcolor=#fefefe
| 391798 ||  || — || September 5, 2008 || Kitt Peak || Spacewatch || FLO || align=right data-sort-value="0.61" | 610 m || 
|-id=799 bgcolor=#fefefe
| 391799 ||  || — || September 3, 2008 || Kitt Peak || Spacewatch || NYS || align=right data-sort-value="0.64" | 640 m || 
|-id=800 bgcolor=#fefefe
| 391800 ||  || — || September 6, 2008 || Mount Lemmon || Mount Lemmon Survey || V || align=right data-sort-value="0.68" | 680 m || 
|}

391801–391900 

|-bgcolor=#fefefe
| 391801 ||  || — || September 7, 2008 || Catalina || CSS || — || align=right | 1.0 km || 
|-id=802 bgcolor=#C2FFFF
| 391802 ||  || — || September 6, 2008 || Kitt Peak || Spacewatch || L4 || align=right | 9.1 km || 
|-id=803 bgcolor=#E9E9E9
| 391803 ||  || — || September 6, 2008 || Mount Lemmon || Mount Lemmon Survey || RAF || align=right | 1.1 km || 
|-id=804 bgcolor=#C2FFFF
| 391804 ||  || — || September 3, 2008 || Kitt Peak || Spacewatch || L4 || align=right | 7.2 km || 
|-id=805 bgcolor=#fefefe
| 391805 ||  || — || September 7, 2008 || Mount Lemmon || Mount Lemmon Survey || — || align=right data-sort-value="0.80" | 800 m || 
|-id=806 bgcolor=#C2FFFF
| 391806 ||  || — || September 2, 2008 || Kitt Peak || Spacewatch || L4 || align=right | 7.1 km || 
|-id=807 bgcolor=#fefefe
| 391807 ||  || — || September 3, 2008 || Kitt Peak || Spacewatch || V || align=right data-sort-value="0.83" | 830 m || 
|-id=808 bgcolor=#fefefe
| 391808 ||  || — || September 4, 2008 || Socorro || LINEAR || FLO || align=right data-sort-value="0.80" | 800 m || 
|-id=809 bgcolor=#E9E9E9
| 391809 ||  || — || September 4, 2008 || Kitt Peak || Spacewatch || — || align=right data-sort-value="0.92" | 920 m || 
|-id=810 bgcolor=#fefefe
| 391810 ||  || — || September 4, 2008 || Kitt Peak || Spacewatch || FLO || align=right data-sort-value="0.65" | 650 m || 
|-id=811 bgcolor=#fefefe
| 391811 ||  || — || September 5, 2008 || Kitt Peak || Spacewatch || V || align=right data-sort-value="0.75" | 750 m || 
|-id=812 bgcolor=#fefefe
| 391812 ||  || — || September 6, 2008 || Mount Lemmon || Mount Lemmon Survey || — || align=right data-sort-value="0.78" | 780 m || 
|-id=813 bgcolor=#fefefe
| 391813 ||  || — || September 7, 2008 || Catalina || CSS || V || align=right data-sort-value="0.55" | 550 m || 
|-id=814 bgcolor=#FA8072
| 391814 ||  || — || September 22, 2008 || Socorro || LINEAR || — || align=right data-sort-value="0.64" | 640 m || 
|-id=815 bgcolor=#fefefe
| 391815 ||  || — || September 22, 2008 || Goodricke-Pigott || R. A. Tucker || — || align=right data-sort-value="0.98" | 980 m || 
|-id=816 bgcolor=#E9E9E9
| 391816 ||  || — || September 19, 2008 || Kitt Peak || Spacewatch || — || align=right data-sort-value="0.90" | 900 m || 
|-id=817 bgcolor=#fefefe
| 391817 ||  || — || September 19, 2008 || Kitt Peak || Spacewatch || FLO || align=right data-sort-value="0.81" | 810 m || 
|-id=818 bgcolor=#fefefe
| 391818 ||  || — || September 19, 2008 || Kitt Peak || Spacewatch || V || align=right data-sort-value="0.82" | 820 m || 
|-id=819 bgcolor=#E9E9E9
| 391819 ||  || — || September 20, 2008 || Kitt Peak || Spacewatch || — || align=right | 2.2 km || 
|-id=820 bgcolor=#fefefe
| 391820 ||  || — || September 9, 2008 || Kitt Peak || Spacewatch || V || align=right data-sort-value="0.83" | 830 m || 
|-id=821 bgcolor=#fefefe
| 391821 ||  || — || September 20, 2008 || Kitt Peak || Spacewatch || — || align=right data-sort-value="0.78" | 780 m || 
|-id=822 bgcolor=#C2FFFF
| 391822 ||  || — || September 2, 2008 || Kitt Peak || Spacewatch || L4 || align=right | 7.2 km || 
|-id=823 bgcolor=#fefefe
| 391823 ||  || — || September 9, 2008 || Kitt Peak || Spacewatch || ERI || align=right | 1.3 km || 
|-id=824 bgcolor=#E9E9E9
| 391824 ||  || — || September 20, 2008 || Kitt Peak || Spacewatch || ADE || align=right | 2.0 km || 
|-id=825 bgcolor=#E9E9E9
| 391825 ||  || — || September 21, 2008 || Kitt Peak || Spacewatch || — || align=right data-sort-value="0.78" | 780 m || 
|-id=826 bgcolor=#E9E9E9
| 391826 ||  || — || September 6, 2008 || Kitt Peak || Spacewatch || — || align=right data-sort-value="0.68" | 680 m || 
|-id=827 bgcolor=#fefefe
| 391827 ||  || — || September 22, 2008 || Kitt Peak || Spacewatch || NYS || align=right data-sort-value="0.70" | 700 m || 
|-id=828 bgcolor=#fefefe
| 391828 ||  || — || September 22, 2008 || Mount Lemmon || Mount Lemmon Survey || V || align=right data-sort-value="0.69" | 690 m || 
|-id=829 bgcolor=#fefefe
| 391829 ||  || — || September 22, 2008 || Mount Lemmon || Mount Lemmon Survey || — || align=right data-sort-value="0.88" | 880 m || 
|-id=830 bgcolor=#fefefe
| 391830 ||  || — || September 22, 2008 || Mount Lemmon || Mount Lemmon Survey || — || align=right | 1.0 km || 
|-id=831 bgcolor=#fefefe
| 391831 ||  || — || September 22, 2008 || Kitt Peak || Spacewatch || NYS || align=right data-sort-value="0.72" | 720 m || 
|-id=832 bgcolor=#fefefe
| 391832 ||  || — || September 27, 2008 || Goodricke-Pigott || R. A. Tucker || — || align=right data-sort-value="0.99" | 990 m || 
|-id=833 bgcolor=#fefefe
| 391833 ||  || — || September 6, 2008 || Catalina || CSS || — || align=right | 1.2 km || 
|-id=834 bgcolor=#fefefe
| 391834 ||  || — || September 27, 2008 || Andrushivka || Andrushivka Obs. || — || align=right data-sort-value="0.81" | 810 m || 
|-id=835 bgcolor=#fefefe
| 391835 ||  || — || September 3, 2008 || Kitt Peak || Spacewatch || — || align=right | 1.1 km || 
|-id=836 bgcolor=#E9E9E9
| 391836 ||  || — || September 10, 2008 || Kitt Peak || Spacewatch || — || align=right data-sort-value="0.96" | 960 m || 
|-id=837 bgcolor=#fefefe
| 391837 ||  || — || September 21, 2008 || Mount Lemmon || Mount Lemmon Survey || — || align=right data-sort-value="0.82" | 820 m || 
|-id=838 bgcolor=#fefefe
| 391838 ||  || — || September 24, 2008 || Kitt Peak || Spacewatch || — || align=right data-sort-value="0.64" | 640 m || 
|-id=839 bgcolor=#fefefe
| 391839 ||  || — || November 14, 1995 || Kitt Peak || Spacewatch || — || align=right data-sort-value="0.81" | 810 m || 
|-id=840 bgcolor=#E9E9E9
| 391840 ||  || — || September 25, 2008 || Kitt Peak || Spacewatch || — || align=right | 2.4 km || 
|-id=841 bgcolor=#fefefe
| 391841 ||  || — || September 27, 2008 || Mount Lemmon || Mount Lemmon Survey || — || align=right | 1.1 km || 
|-id=842 bgcolor=#fefefe
| 391842 ||  || — || March 12, 2007 || Kitt Peak || Spacewatch || — || align=right data-sort-value="0.84" | 840 m || 
|-id=843 bgcolor=#fefefe
| 391843 ||  || — || September 5, 2008 || Kitt Peak || Spacewatch || V || align=right data-sort-value="0.75" | 750 m || 
|-id=844 bgcolor=#C2FFFF
| 391844 ||  || — || September 23, 2008 || Kitt Peak || Spacewatch || L4 || align=right | 9.0 km || 
|-id=845 bgcolor=#C2FFFF
| 391845 ||  || — || September 22, 2008 || Kitt Peak || Spacewatch || L4 || align=right | 10 km || 
|-id=846 bgcolor=#d6d6d6
| 391846 ||  || — || September 23, 2008 || Kitt Peak || Spacewatch || — || align=right | 2.7 km || 
|-id=847 bgcolor=#fefefe
| 391847 ||  || — || September 24, 2008 || Kitt Peak || Spacewatch || SUL || align=right | 1.8 km || 
|-id=848 bgcolor=#E9E9E9
| 391848 ||  || — || September 21, 2008 || Mount Lemmon || Mount Lemmon Survey || — || align=right | 1.4 km || 
|-id=849 bgcolor=#fefefe
| 391849 ||  || — || September 19, 2008 || Kitt Peak || Spacewatch || — || align=right data-sort-value="0.97" | 970 m || 
|-id=850 bgcolor=#E9E9E9
| 391850 ||  || — || September 22, 2008 || Mount Lemmon || Mount Lemmon Survey || MAR || align=right | 1.3 km || 
|-id=851 bgcolor=#fefefe
| 391851 ||  || — || September 23, 2008 || Mount Lemmon || Mount Lemmon Survey || NYS || align=right data-sort-value="0.72" | 720 m || 
|-id=852 bgcolor=#FA8072
| 391852 ||  || — || September 20, 2008 || Catalina || CSS || — || align=right data-sort-value="0.73" | 730 m || 
|-id=853 bgcolor=#E9E9E9
| 391853 ||  || — || September 21, 2008 || Kitt Peak || Spacewatch || — || align=right data-sort-value="0.92" | 920 m || 
|-id=854 bgcolor=#fefefe
| 391854 ||  || — || September 22, 2008 || Kitt Peak || Spacewatch || — || align=right | 1.0 km || 
|-id=855 bgcolor=#E9E9E9
| 391855 ||  || — || September 22, 2008 || Catalina || CSS || RAF || align=right data-sort-value="0.83" | 830 m || 
|-id=856 bgcolor=#fefefe
| 391856 ||  || — || September 27, 2008 || Mount Lemmon || Mount Lemmon Survey || — || align=right | 1.1 km || 
|-id=857 bgcolor=#fefefe
| 391857 ||  || — || October 1, 2008 || Mount Lemmon || Mount Lemmon Survey || — || align=right data-sort-value="0.83" | 830 m || 
|-id=858 bgcolor=#E9E9E9
| 391858 ||  || — || September 22, 2008 || Mount Lemmon || Mount Lemmon Survey || — || align=right | 1.2 km || 
|-id=859 bgcolor=#fefefe
| 391859 ||  || — || October 2, 2008 || Catalina || CSS || — || align=right data-sort-value="0.93" | 930 m || 
|-id=860 bgcolor=#fefefe
| 391860 ||  || — || October 2, 2008 || Mount Lemmon || Mount Lemmon Survey || — || align=right data-sort-value="0.83" | 830 m || 
|-id=861 bgcolor=#E9E9E9
| 391861 ||  || — || October 6, 2004 || Kitt Peak || Spacewatch || — || align=right | 1.3 km || 
|-id=862 bgcolor=#E9E9E9
| 391862 ||  || — || October 1, 2008 || Kitt Peak || Spacewatch || — || align=right data-sort-value="0.99" | 990 m || 
|-id=863 bgcolor=#fefefe
| 391863 ||  || — || October 1, 2008 || Mount Lemmon || Mount Lemmon Survey || — || align=right | 1.1 km || 
|-id=864 bgcolor=#fefefe
| 391864 ||  || — || October 2, 2008 || Kitt Peak || Spacewatch || NYS || align=right data-sort-value="0.70" | 700 m || 
|-id=865 bgcolor=#E9E9E9
| 391865 ||  || — || October 2, 2008 || Kitt Peak || Spacewatch || — || align=right | 1.6 km || 
|-id=866 bgcolor=#E9E9E9
| 391866 ||  || — || October 2, 2008 || Catalina || CSS || — || align=right | 1.3 km || 
|-id=867 bgcolor=#E9E9E9
| 391867 ||  || — || October 2, 2008 || Kitt Peak || Spacewatch || — || align=right | 1.2 km || 
|-id=868 bgcolor=#fefefe
| 391868 ||  || — || October 2, 2008 || Kitt Peak || Spacewatch || — || align=right data-sort-value="0.90" | 900 m || 
|-id=869 bgcolor=#fefefe
| 391869 ||  || — || October 3, 2008 || Kitt Peak || Spacewatch || — || align=right data-sort-value="0.76" | 760 m || 
|-id=870 bgcolor=#C2FFFF
| 391870 ||  || — || October 4, 2008 || La Sagra || OAM Obs. || L4 || align=right | 11 km || 
|-id=871 bgcolor=#E9E9E9
| 391871 ||  || — || September 22, 2008 || Kitt Peak || Spacewatch || — || align=right | 1.3 km || 
|-id=872 bgcolor=#fefefe
| 391872 ||  || — || October 6, 2008 || Catalina || CSS || V || align=right data-sort-value="0.89" | 890 m || 
|-id=873 bgcolor=#fefefe
| 391873 ||  || — || September 23, 2008 || Kitt Peak || Spacewatch || FLO || align=right data-sort-value="0.81" | 810 m || 
|-id=874 bgcolor=#fefefe
| 391874 ||  || — || October 6, 2008 || Catalina || CSS || V || align=right data-sort-value="0.75" | 750 m || 
|-id=875 bgcolor=#E9E9E9
| 391875 ||  || — || October 6, 2008 || Catalina || CSS || — || align=right | 1.3 km || 
|-id=876 bgcolor=#fefefe
| 391876 ||  || — || October 6, 2008 || Kitt Peak || Spacewatch || V || align=right data-sort-value="0.80" | 800 m || 
|-id=877 bgcolor=#C2FFFF
| 391877 ||  || — || October 8, 2008 || Mount Lemmon || Mount Lemmon Survey || L4 || align=right | 8.6 km || 
|-id=878 bgcolor=#fefefe
| 391878 ||  || — || September 23, 2008 || Kitt Peak || Spacewatch || — || align=right | 1.0 km || 
|-id=879 bgcolor=#fefefe
| 391879 ||  || — || October 8, 2008 || Mount Lemmon || Mount Lemmon Survey || V || align=right data-sort-value="0.71" | 710 m || 
|-id=880 bgcolor=#C2FFFF
| 391880 ||  || — || October 9, 2008 || Mount Lemmon || Mount Lemmon Survey || L4 || align=right | 7.1 km || 
|-id=881 bgcolor=#d6d6d6
| 391881 ||  || — || October 9, 2008 || Catalina || CSS || — || align=right | 4.5 km || 
|-id=882 bgcolor=#fefefe
| 391882 ||  || — || October 4, 2008 || La Sagra || OAM Obs. || V || align=right data-sort-value="0.65" | 650 m || 
|-id=883 bgcolor=#E9E9E9
| 391883 ||  || — || October 22, 2008 || Socorro || LINEAR || — || align=right | 3.2 km || 
|-id=884 bgcolor=#E9E9E9
| 391884 ||  || — || September 25, 2008 || Kitt Peak || Spacewatch || — || align=right | 1.6 km || 
|-id=885 bgcolor=#d6d6d6
| 391885 ||  || — || May 2, 2006 || Mount Lemmon || Mount Lemmon Survey || — || align=right | 2.7 km || 
|-id=886 bgcolor=#E9E9E9
| 391886 ||  || — || October 20, 2008 || Kitt Peak || Spacewatch || — || align=right data-sort-value="0.72" | 720 m || 
|-id=887 bgcolor=#fefefe
| 391887 ||  || — || October 20, 2008 || Kitt Peak || Spacewatch || — || align=right | 1.3 km || 
|-id=888 bgcolor=#d6d6d6
| 391888 ||  || — || October 20, 2008 || Kitt Peak || Spacewatch || EOS || align=right | 2.3 km || 
|-id=889 bgcolor=#E9E9E9
| 391889 ||  || — || October 20, 2008 || Kitt Peak || Spacewatch || — || align=right | 1.7 km || 
|-id=890 bgcolor=#fefefe
| 391890 ||  || — || October 20, 2008 || Lulin || LUSS || MAS || align=right data-sort-value="0.83" | 830 m || 
|-id=891 bgcolor=#E9E9E9
| 391891 ||  || — || October 21, 2008 || Kitt Peak || Spacewatch || — || align=right | 1.3 km || 
|-id=892 bgcolor=#E9E9E9
| 391892 ||  || — || September 23, 2008 || Mount Lemmon || Mount Lemmon Survey || HOF || align=right | 2.6 km || 
|-id=893 bgcolor=#E9E9E9
| 391893 ||  || — || October 3, 2008 || Mount Lemmon || Mount Lemmon Survey || MIS || align=right | 1.9 km || 
|-id=894 bgcolor=#E9E9E9
| 391894 ||  || — || October 21, 2008 || Kitt Peak || Spacewatch || — || align=right | 1.2 km || 
|-id=895 bgcolor=#E9E9E9
| 391895 ||  || — || September 22, 2008 || Kitt Peak || Spacewatch || — || align=right data-sort-value="0.82" | 820 m || 
|-id=896 bgcolor=#E9E9E9
| 391896 ||  || — || October 24, 2008 || Socorro || LINEAR || — || align=right | 1.7 km || 
|-id=897 bgcolor=#E9E9E9
| 391897 ||  || — || October 23, 2008 || Socorro || LINEAR || — || align=right | 1.4 km || 
|-id=898 bgcolor=#E9E9E9
| 391898 ||  || — || October 26, 2008 || Socorro || LINEAR || — || align=right | 2.7 km || 
|-id=899 bgcolor=#E9E9E9
| 391899 ||  || — || October 25, 2008 || Socorro || LINEAR || — || align=right | 1.4 km || 
|-id=900 bgcolor=#fefefe
| 391900 ||  || — || October 22, 2008 || Kitt Peak || Spacewatch || V || align=right data-sort-value="0.81" | 810 m || 
|}

391901–392000 

|-bgcolor=#fefefe
| 391901 ||  || — || October 22, 2008 || Kitt Peak || Spacewatch || — || align=right | 1.0 km || 
|-id=902 bgcolor=#fefefe
| 391902 ||  || — || October 22, 2008 || Kitt Peak || Spacewatch || — || align=right data-sort-value="0.77" | 770 m || 
|-id=903 bgcolor=#E9E9E9
| 391903 ||  || — || October 22, 2008 || Kitt Peak || Spacewatch || — || align=right data-sort-value="0.92" | 920 m || 
|-id=904 bgcolor=#E9E9E9
| 391904 ||  || — || October 22, 2008 || Mount Lemmon || Mount Lemmon Survey || — || align=right | 2.0 km || 
|-id=905 bgcolor=#E9E9E9
| 391905 ||  || — || October 22, 2008 || Kitt Peak || Spacewatch || — || align=right data-sort-value="0.96" | 960 m || 
|-id=906 bgcolor=#E9E9E9
| 391906 ||  || — || October 22, 2008 || Kitt Peak || Spacewatch || — || align=right | 1.1 km || 
|-id=907 bgcolor=#fefefe
| 391907 ||  || — || October 23, 2008 || Kitt Peak || Spacewatch || V || align=right data-sort-value="0.68" | 680 m || 
|-id=908 bgcolor=#d6d6d6
| 391908 ||  || — || September 9, 2008 || Mount Lemmon || Mount Lemmon Survey || — || align=right | 3.6 km || 
|-id=909 bgcolor=#E9E9E9
| 391909 ||  || — || October 10, 2008 || Mount Lemmon || Mount Lemmon Survey || — || align=right data-sort-value="0.76" | 760 m || 
|-id=910 bgcolor=#fefefe
| 391910 ||  || — || October 24, 2008 || Mount Lemmon || Mount Lemmon Survey || — || align=right data-sort-value="0.82" | 820 m || 
|-id=911 bgcolor=#fefefe
| 391911 ||  || — || December 26, 2005 || Kitt Peak || Spacewatch || MAS || align=right data-sort-value="0.84" | 840 m || 
|-id=912 bgcolor=#E9E9E9
| 391912 ||  || — || September 9, 2008 || Mount Lemmon || Mount Lemmon Survey || — || align=right | 1.2 km || 
|-id=913 bgcolor=#fefefe
| 391913 ||  || — || March 15, 2007 || Kitt Peak || Spacewatch || — || align=right data-sort-value="0.74" | 740 m || 
|-id=914 bgcolor=#fefefe
| 391914 ||  || — || October 27, 2008 || Kitt Peak || Spacewatch || NYS || align=right data-sort-value="0.74" | 740 m || 
|-id=915 bgcolor=#E9E9E9
| 391915 ||  || — || October 28, 2008 || Socorro || LINEAR || — || align=right | 2.1 km || 
|-id=916 bgcolor=#fefefe
| 391916 ||  || — || October 28, 2008 || Socorro || LINEAR || FLO || align=right data-sort-value="0.75" | 750 m || 
|-id=917 bgcolor=#E9E9E9
| 391917 ||  || — || October 23, 2008 || Kitt Peak || Spacewatch || — || align=right data-sort-value="0.93" | 930 m || 
|-id=918 bgcolor=#E9E9E9
| 391918 ||  || — || October 23, 2008 || Kitt Peak || Spacewatch || — || align=right data-sort-value="0.89" | 890 m || 
|-id=919 bgcolor=#d6d6d6
| 391919 ||  || — || October 25, 2008 || Kitt Peak || Spacewatch || — || align=right | 2.1 km || 
|-id=920 bgcolor=#E9E9E9
| 391920 ||  || — || October 26, 2008 || Kitt Peak || Spacewatch || — || align=right | 1.2 km || 
|-id=921 bgcolor=#E9E9E9
| 391921 ||  || — || October 20, 2008 || Kitt Peak || Spacewatch || — || align=right | 1.1 km || 
|-id=922 bgcolor=#E9E9E9
| 391922 ||  || — || October 28, 2008 || Kitt Peak || Spacewatch || — || align=right data-sort-value="0.71" | 710 m || 
|-id=923 bgcolor=#fefefe
| 391923 ||  || — || October 28, 2008 || Kitt Peak || Spacewatch || — || align=right data-sort-value="0.98" | 980 m || 
|-id=924 bgcolor=#E9E9E9
| 391924 ||  || — || September 25, 2008 || Kitt Peak || Spacewatch || — || align=right | 1.2 km || 
|-id=925 bgcolor=#E9E9E9
| 391925 ||  || — || October 29, 2008 || Kitt Peak || Spacewatch || — || align=right data-sort-value="0.75" | 750 m || 
|-id=926 bgcolor=#fefefe
| 391926 ||  || — || November 22, 2005 || Kitt Peak || Spacewatch || V || align=right data-sort-value="0.79" | 790 m || 
|-id=927 bgcolor=#E9E9E9
| 391927 ||  || — || October 29, 2008 || Kitt Peak || Spacewatch || — || align=right data-sort-value="0.78" | 780 m || 
|-id=928 bgcolor=#E9E9E9
| 391928 ||  || — || October 21, 2008 || Kitt Peak || Spacewatch || — || align=right | 1.8 km || 
|-id=929 bgcolor=#E9E9E9
| 391929 ||  || — || October 29, 2008 || Kitt Peak || Spacewatch || — || align=right | 1.8 km || 
|-id=930 bgcolor=#fefefe
| 391930 ||  || — || October 29, 2008 || Kitt Peak || Spacewatch || — || align=right data-sort-value="0.94" | 940 m || 
|-id=931 bgcolor=#fefefe
| 391931 ||  || — || October 31, 2008 || Kitt Peak || Spacewatch || — || align=right data-sort-value="0.82" | 820 m || 
|-id=932 bgcolor=#E9E9E9
| 391932 ||  || — || October 22, 2008 || Kitt Peak || Spacewatch || — || align=right | 1.3 km || 
|-id=933 bgcolor=#E9E9E9
| 391933 ||  || — || October 31, 2008 || Kitt Peak || Spacewatch || — || align=right | 1.2 km || 
|-id=934 bgcolor=#E9E9E9
| 391934 ||  || — || September 7, 2008 || Mount Lemmon || Mount Lemmon Survey || — || align=right | 1.1 km || 
|-id=935 bgcolor=#E9E9E9
| 391935 ||  || — || October 24, 2008 || Mount Lemmon || Mount Lemmon Survey || — || align=right | 2.3 km || 
|-id=936 bgcolor=#E9E9E9
| 391936 ||  || — || October 27, 2008 || Mount Lemmon || Mount Lemmon Survey || — || align=right | 1.4 km || 
|-id=937 bgcolor=#E9E9E9
| 391937 ||  || — || October 25, 2008 || Kitt Peak || Spacewatch || — || align=right | 1.2 km || 
|-id=938 bgcolor=#FA8072
| 391938 ||  || — || October 24, 2008 || Socorro || LINEAR || — || align=right data-sort-value="0.83" | 830 m || 
|-id=939 bgcolor=#E9E9E9
| 391939 ||  || — || November 1, 2008 || Socorro || LINEAR || MAR || align=right | 1.7 km || 
|-id=940 bgcolor=#E9E9E9
| 391940 ||  || — || November 2, 2008 || Mount Lemmon || Mount Lemmon Survey || — || align=right data-sort-value="0.99" | 990 m || 
|-id=941 bgcolor=#E9E9E9
| 391941 ||  || — || September 27, 2008 || Mount Lemmon || Mount Lemmon Survey || — || align=right | 1.2 km || 
|-id=942 bgcolor=#E9E9E9
| 391942 ||  || — || November 2, 2008 || Kitt Peak || Spacewatch || — || align=right | 1.1 km || 
|-id=943 bgcolor=#E9E9E9
| 391943 ||  || — || November 3, 2008 || Mount Lemmon || Mount Lemmon Survey || — || align=right | 1.1 km || 
|-id=944 bgcolor=#E9E9E9
| 391944 ||  || — || November 4, 2008 || Kitt Peak || Spacewatch || — || align=right | 1.4 km || 
|-id=945 bgcolor=#E9E9E9
| 391945 ||  || — || November 7, 2008 || Catalina || CSS || — || align=right data-sort-value="0.93" | 930 m || 
|-id=946 bgcolor=#E9E9E9
| 391946 ||  || — || November 2, 2008 || Socorro || LINEAR || EUN || align=right | 1.2 km || 
|-id=947 bgcolor=#E9E9E9
| 391947 Tanithlee ||  ||  || November 8, 2008 || Mount Lemmon || Mount Lemmon Survey || — || align=right | 1.4 km || 
|-id=948 bgcolor=#E9E9E9
| 391948 ||  || — || November 1, 2008 || Mount Lemmon || Mount Lemmon Survey || — || align=right | 1.4 km || 
|-id=949 bgcolor=#fefefe
| 391949 ||  || — || November 7, 2008 || Mount Lemmon || Mount Lemmon Survey || V || align=right data-sort-value="0.82" | 820 m || 
|-id=950 bgcolor=#E9E9E9
| 391950 ||  || — || November 17, 2008 || Kitt Peak || Spacewatch || — || align=right data-sort-value="0.98" | 980 m || 
|-id=951 bgcolor=#E9E9E9
| 391951 ||  || — || November 18, 2008 || La Sagra || OAM Obs. || — || align=right | 1.7 km || 
|-id=952 bgcolor=#fefefe
| 391952 ||  || — || November 17, 2008 || Kitt Peak || Spacewatch || — || align=right | 2.4 km || 
|-id=953 bgcolor=#E9E9E9
| 391953 ||  || — || November 17, 2008 || Kitt Peak || Spacewatch || — || align=right data-sort-value="0.83" | 830 m || 
|-id=954 bgcolor=#E9E9E9
| 391954 ||  || — || November 17, 2008 || Kitt Peak || Spacewatch || — || align=right | 1.1 km || 
|-id=955 bgcolor=#E9E9E9
| 391955 ||  || — || November 20, 2008 || Mount Lemmon || Mount Lemmon Survey || BRU || align=right | 2.6 km || 
|-id=956 bgcolor=#fefefe
| 391956 ||  || — || November 17, 2008 || Kitt Peak || Spacewatch || MAS || align=right data-sort-value="0.98" | 980 m || 
|-id=957 bgcolor=#fefefe
| 391957 ||  || — || November 3, 2008 || Kitt Peak || Spacewatch || — || align=right | 1.1 km || 
|-id=958 bgcolor=#fefefe
| 391958 ||  || — || November 18, 2008 || Kitt Peak || Spacewatch || NYS || align=right data-sort-value="0.66" | 660 m || 
|-id=959 bgcolor=#E9E9E9
| 391959 ||  || — || November 19, 2008 || Mount Lemmon || Mount Lemmon Survey || — || align=right | 1.6 km || 
|-id=960 bgcolor=#E9E9E9
| 391960 ||  || — || November 20, 2008 || Kitt Peak || Spacewatch || GER || align=right | 1.8 km || 
|-id=961 bgcolor=#E9E9E9
| 391961 ||  || — || November 19, 2008 || Catalina || CSS || — || align=right | 1.7 km || 
|-id=962 bgcolor=#fefefe
| 391962 ||  || — || November 24, 2008 || Mount Lemmon || Mount Lemmon Survey || — || align=right data-sort-value="0.96" | 960 m || 
|-id=963 bgcolor=#E9E9E9
| 391963 ||  || — || November 26, 2008 || La Sagra || OAM Obs. || — || align=right | 2.7 km || 
|-id=964 bgcolor=#E9E9E9
| 391964 ||  || — || November 30, 2008 || Kitt Peak || Spacewatch || — || align=right | 1.3 km || 
|-id=965 bgcolor=#E9E9E9
| 391965 ||  || — || October 31, 2008 || Kitt Peak || Spacewatch || — || align=right data-sort-value="0.91" | 910 m || 
|-id=966 bgcolor=#E9E9E9
| 391966 ||  || — || November 17, 2008 || Kitt Peak || Spacewatch || — || align=right | 3.3 km || 
|-id=967 bgcolor=#E9E9E9
| 391967 ||  || — || November 23, 2008 || Mount Lemmon || Mount Lemmon Survey || WIT || align=right | 1.1 km || 
|-id=968 bgcolor=#E9E9E9
| 391968 ||  || — || November 22, 2008 || Kitt Peak || Spacewatch || — || align=right | 2.4 km || 
|-id=969 bgcolor=#E9E9E9
| 391969 ||  || — || February 2, 2006 || Kitt Peak || Spacewatch || — || align=right | 1.2 km || 
|-id=970 bgcolor=#E9E9E9
| 391970 ||  || — || November 22, 2008 || Kitt Peak || Spacewatch || — || align=right | 1.0 km || 
|-id=971 bgcolor=#E9E9E9
| 391971 ||  || — || November 20, 2008 || Kitt Peak || Spacewatch || — || align=right | 1.4 km || 
|-id=972 bgcolor=#E9E9E9
| 391972 ||  || — || October 24, 2008 || Catalina || CSS || — || align=right | 1.2 km || 
|-id=973 bgcolor=#E9E9E9
| 391973 ||  || — || May 25, 2006 || Mount Lemmon || Mount Lemmon Survey || — || align=right | 1.2 km || 
|-id=974 bgcolor=#E9E9E9
| 391974 ||  || — || December 1, 2008 || Kitt Peak || Spacewatch || — || align=right | 1.8 km || 
|-id=975 bgcolor=#fefefe
| 391975 ||  || — || December 2, 2008 || Kitt Peak || Spacewatch || FLO || align=right data-sort-value="0.70" | 700 m || 
|-id=976 bgcolor=#fefefe
| 391976 ||  || — || December 2, 2008 || Kitt Peak || Spacewatch || — || align=right | 1.1 km || 
|-id=977 bgcolor=#E9E9E9
| 391977 ||  || — || December 4, 2008 || Kitt Peak || Spacewatch || — || align=right | 1.3 km || 
|-id=978 bgcolor=#E9E9E9
| 391978 ||  || — || December 7, 2008 || Mount Lemmon || Mount Lemmon Survey || — || align=right | 1.8 km || 
|-id=979 bgcolor=#d6d6d6
| 391979 ||  || — || December 4, 2008 || Mount Lemmon || Mount Lemmon Survey || — || align=right | 3.2 km || 
|-id=980 bgcolor=#E9E9E9
| 391980 ||  || — || April 14, 2001 || Kitt Peak || Spacewatch || — || align=right | 1.8 km || 
|-id=981 bgcolor=#E9E9E9
| 391981 ||  || — || December 4, 2008 || Catalina || CSS || — || align=right | 2.5 km || 
|-id=982 bgcolor=#E9E9E9
| 391982 || 2008 YK || — || December 18, 2008 || Calar Alto || F. Hormuth || — || align=right | 1.7 km || 
|-id=983 bgcolor=#E9E9E9
| 391983 ||  || — || December 22, 2008 || Dauban || F. Kugel || — || align=right | 2.4 km || 
|-id=984 bgcolor=#E9E9E9
| 391984 ||  || — || December 21, 2008 || Catalina || CSS || — || align=right | 1.8 km || 
|-id=985 bgcolor=#E9E9E9
| 391985 ||  || — || December 23, 2008 || Dauban || F. Kugel || fast? || align=right data-sort-value="0.99" | 990 m || 
|-id=986 bgcolor=#E9E9E9
| 391986 ||  || — || December 21, 2008 || Mount Lemmon || Mount Lemmon Survey || — || align=right | 1.9 km || 
|-id=987 bgcolor=#E9E9E9
| 391987 ||  || — || December 21, 2008 || Catalina || CSS || — || align=right | 1.4 km || 
|-id=988 bgcolor=#E9E9E9
| 391988 Illmárton ||  ||  || December 27, 2008 || Piszkéstető || K. Sárneczky || — || align=right | 1.7 km || 
|-id=989 bgcolor=#E9E9E9
| 391989 ||  || — || November 19, 2008 || Mount Lemmon || Mount Lemmon Survey || EUN || align=right | 1.8 km || 
|-id=990 bgcolor=#E9E9E9
| 391990 ||  || — || December 22, 2008 || Socorro || LINEAR || JUN || align=right | 1.3 km || 
|-id=991 bgcolor=#E9E9E9
| 391991 ||  || — || December 28, 2008 || Dauban || F. Kugel || — || align=right | 2.1 km || 
|-id=992 bgcolor=#E9E9E9
| 391992 ||  || — || December 22, 2008 || Kitt Peak || Spacewatch || — || align=right | 1.6 km || 
|-id=993 bgcolor=#E9E9E9
| 391993 ||  || — || December 27, 2008 || Bergisch Gladbac || W. Bickel || — || align=right | 2.8 km || 
|-id=994 bgcolor=#d6d6d6
| 391994 ||  || — || December 29, 2008 || Mount Lemmon || Mount Lemmon Survey || — || align=right | 1.8 km || 
|-id=995 bgcolor=#E9E9E9
| 391995 ||  || — || December 22, 2008 || Kitt Peak || Spacewatch || — || align=right | 1.3 km || 
|-id=996 bgcolor=#d6d6d6
| 391996 Zhunenghong ||  ||  || December 31, 2008 || XuYi || PMO NEO || — || align=right | 4.2 km || 
|-id=997 bgcolor=#E9E9E9
| 391997 ||  || — || December 21, 2008 || Kitt Peak || Spacewatch || — || align=right | 1.7 km || 
|-id=998 bgcolor=#E9E9E9
| 391998 ||  || — || December 29, 2008 || Kitt Peak || Spacewatch || — || align=right | 3.0 km || 
|-id=999 bgcolor=#fefefe
| 391999 ||  || — || December 21, 2008 || Kitt Peak || Spacewatch || NYS || align=right data-sort-value="0.83" | 830 m || 
|-id=000 bgcolor=#E9E9E9
| 392000 ||  || — || December 29, 2008 || Kitt Peak || Spacewatch || ADE || align=right | 3.1 km || 
|}

References

External links 
 Discovery Circumstances: Numbered Minor Planets (390001)–(395000) (IAU Minor Planet Center)

0391